= List of Scottish inventions and discoveries =

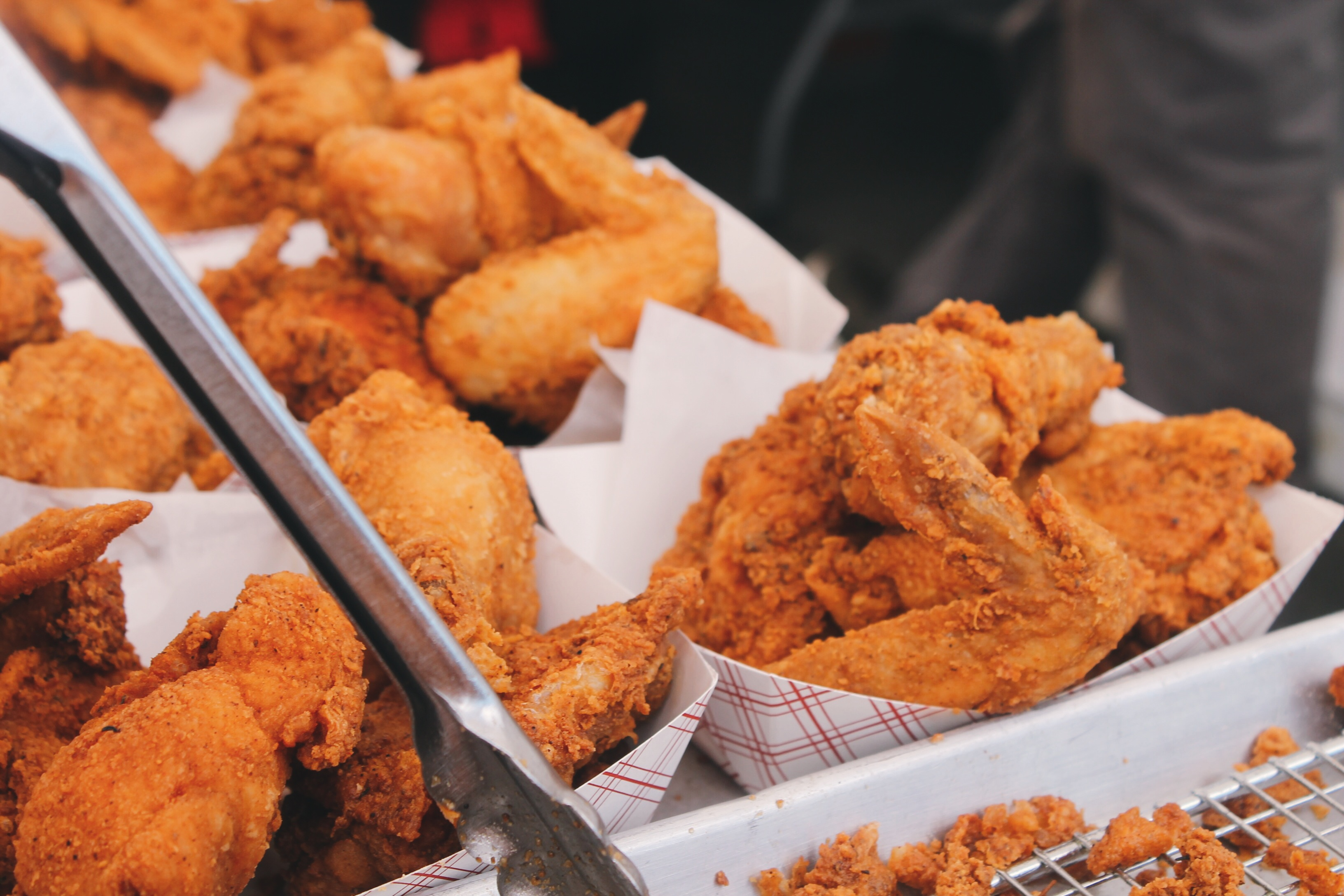
Fried chicken is said to have Scottish origins.

Scottish inventions and discoveries are objects, processes or techniques either partially or entirely invented, innovated, or discovered by a person born in or descended from Scotland. In some cases, an invention's Scottishness is determined by the fact that it came into existence in Scotland (e.g., animal cloning), by non-Scots working in the country. Often, things that are discovered for the first time are also called "inventions" and in many cases there is no clear line between the two.

Some Scottish contributions have indirectly and directly led to controversial political ideas and policies, such as the measures taken to enforce British hegemony in the time of the British Empire.

Some of the most significant products of Scottish ingenuity include James Watt's steam engine, improving on that of Thomas Newcomen, joint role in creating the bicycle, macadamisation (not to be confused with tarmac or tarmacadam), Alexander Graham Bell's invention of the first practical telephone, John Logie Baird's invention of television, Alexander Fleming's discovery of penicillin and insulin.

The following is a list of inventions, innovations, or discoveries that are known or generally recognised as being Scottish.

== Road transport innovations ==
- Macadamised roads (the basis for, but not specifically, tarmac): John Loudon McAdam (1756–1836)
- The pedal bicycle: Attributed to both Kirkpatrick Macmillan (1813–1878) and Thomas McCall (1834–1904)
- The pneumatic tyre: Robert William Thomson and John Boyd Dunlop (1822–1873)
- The overhead valve engine: David Dunbar Buick (1854–1929)

== Civil engineering innovations ==
- The Falkirk wheel: Initial designs by Nicoll Russell Studios, Architects, RMJM and engineers Binnie, Black, and Veatch (Opened 2002)
- The patent slip for docking vessels: Thomas Morton (1781–1832)
- The Drummond Light: Thomas Drummond (1797–1840)
- "Trac Rail Transposer", a machine to lay rail track patented in 2005, used by Network Rail in the United Kingdom and the New York City Subway in the United States.

== Power innovations ==
- Condensing steam engine improvements: James Watt (1736–1819)
- Thermodynamic cycle: William John Macquorn Rankine (1820–1872)
- Coal-gas lighting: William Murdoch (1754–1839)
- The Stirling heat engine: Rev. Robert Stirling (1790–1878)
- Carbon brushes for dynamos: George Forbes (1849–1936)
- The Clerk cycle gas engine: Sir Dugald Clerk (1854–1932)
- The Pelamis Wave Energy Converter ("red sea snake" wave energy device): Richard Yemm, 1998

== Shipbuilding innovations ==
- Europe's first passenger steamboat: Henry Bell (1767–1830)

== Military innovations ==
- Lieutenant-General Sir David Henderson two areas:
  - Field intelligence. Argued for the establishment of the Intelligence Corps. Wrote Field Intelligence: Its Principles and Practice (1904) and The Art of Reconnaissance (1907) on the tactical intelligence of modern warfare.

== Heavy industry innovations ==
- Coal mining extraction in the sea on an artificial island by Sir George Bruce of Carnock (1575).
- Making cast steel from wrought iron: David Mushet (1772–1847)
- Wrought iron sash bars for glass houses: John C. Loudon (1783–1865)
- The hot blast oven: James Beaumont Neilson (1792–1865)
- The steam hammer: James Nasmyth (1808–1890)
- Improved wire rope: Robert Stirling Newall (1812–1889)
- Steam engine improvements: William Mcnaught (1831–1881)
- The Fairlie, a narrow gauge, double-bogie railway engine: Robert Francis Fairlie (1831–1885)

== Agricultural innovations ==
- Threshing machine improvements: James Meikle (c.1690-c.1780) & Andrew Meikle (1719–1811)
- Hollow pipe drainage: Sir Hew Dalrymple, Lord Drummore (1700–1753)
- The Scotch plough: James Anderson of Hermiston (1739–1808)
- Deanstonisation soil-drainage system: James Smith (1789–1850)
- The mechanical reaping machine: Rev. Patrick Bell (1799–1869)
- The Fresno scraper: James Porteous (1848–1922)
- The Tuley tree shelter: Graham Tuley in 1979

== Communication innovations ==
- Joint development of the telephone: Alexander Graham Bell (1847-1922)
- Print stereotyping: William Ged (1690–1749)
- Roller printing: Thomas Bell (patented 1783)
- The Waverley pen nib innovations thereof: Duncan Cameron (1825–1901) The popular "Waverley" was unique in design with a narrow waist and an upturned tip designed to make the ink flow more smoothly on the paper.
- Light signalling between ships: Admiral Philip H. Colomb (1831–1899)
- The teleprinter: Frederick G. Creed (1871–1957)
- RADAR: A significant contribution made by Robert Watson-Watt (1892–1973) alongside Englishman Henry Tizard (1885-1959) and others
- The automated teller machine and Personal Identification Number system: James Goodfellow (born 1937)

== Publishing firsts ==
- The first edition of the Encyclopedia Britannica (1768–81)
- The first English textbook on surgery (1597)
- The first modern pharmacopaedia, William Cullen (1776). The book became 'Europe's principal text on the classification and treatment of disease'. His ideas survive in the terms nervous energy and neuroses (a word that Cullen coined).
- The educational foundation of Ophthalmology: Stewart Duke-Elder in his ground breaking work including ‘Textbook of Ophthalmology and fifteen volumes of System of Ophthalmology’

== Culture and the arts ==
- Scottish National Portrait Gallery, designed by Sir Robert Rowand Anderson (1889): the world's first purpose-built portrait gallery.

== Scientific innovations ==
- Logarithms: John Napier (1550–1617)
- Modern Economics founded by Adam Smith (1776) 'The father of modern economics' with the publication of The Wealth of Nations.
- Modern Sociology: Adam Ferguson (1767) ‘The Father of Modern Sociology’ with his work An Essay on the History of Civil Society
- Hypnotism: James Braid (1795–1860) the Father of Hypnotherapy
- Tropical medicine: Sir Patrick Manson known as the father of Tropical Medicine
- Modern geology: James Hutton ‘The Founder of Modern Geology’
- The theory of Uniformitarianism: James Hutton (1788): a fundamental principle of Geology the features of the geologic time takes millions of years.
- The theory of electromagnetism: James Clerk Maxwell (1831–1879)
- The discovery of the Composition of Saturn's Rings James Clerk Maxwell (1859): determined the rings of Saturn were composed of numerous small particles, all independently orbiting the planet. At the time it was generally thought the rings were solid. The Maxwell Ringlet and Maxwell Gap were named in his honor.
- The Maxwell–Boltzmann distribution by James Clerk Maxwell (1860): the basis of the kinetic theory of gases, that speeds of molecules in a gas will change at different temperatures. The original theory first hypothesised by Maxwell and confirmed later in conjunction with Ludwig Boltzmann.
- Popularising the decimal point: John Napier (1550–1617)
- The Gregorian telescope: James Gregory (1638–1675)
- The discovery of Proxima Centauri, the closest known star to the Sun, by Robert Innes (1861–1933)
- One of the earliest measurements of distance to the Alpha Centauri star system, the closest such system outside of the Solar System, by Thomas Henderson (1798–1844)
- The discovery of Centaurus A, a well-known starburst galaxy in the constellation of Centaurus, by James Dunlop (1793–1848)
- The discovery of the Horsehead Nebula in the constellation of Orion, by Williamina Fleming (1857–1911)
- The world's first commercial oil refinery and a process of extracting paraffin from coal laying the foundations for the modern oil industry: James Young (1811–1883)
- The identification of the minerals yttrialite, thorogummite, aguilarite and nivenite: by William Niven (1889)
- The pyroscope, atmometer and aethrioscope scientific instruments: Sir John Leslie (1766–1832)
- Identifying the nucleus in living cells: Robert Brown (1773–1858)
- An early form of the Incandescent light bulb: James Bowman Lindsay (1799-1862)
- Colloid chemistry: Thomas Graham (1805–1869)
- Devising the diagramatic system of representing chemical bonds: Alexander Crum Brown (1838–1922)
- Criminal fingerprinting: Henry Faulds (1843–1930)
- Joint role in noble gases: Scotsman Sir William Ramsay (1852–1916) alongside Englishman John William Strutt (1842–1919).
- The cloud chamber recording of atoms: Charles Thomson Rees Wilson (1869–1959)
- The discovery of the Wave of Translation, leading to the modern general theory of solitons by John Scott Russell (1808-1882)
- Statistical graphics: William Playfair founder of the first statistical line charts, bar charts, and pie charts in (1786) and (1801).
- The first isolation of methylated sugars, trimethyl and tetramethyl glucose: James Irvine
- Discovery of the Japp–Klingemann reaction: to synthesize hydrazones from β-keto-acids (or β-keto-esters) and aryl diazonium salts 1887
- The seismometer innovations thereof: James David Forbes
- Metaflex fabric innovations thereof: University of St. Andrews (2010) application of the first manufacturing fabrics that manipulate light in bending it around a subject. Before this such light manipulating atoms were fixed on flat hard surfaces. The team at St Andrews are the first to develop the concept to fabric.
- Tractor beam innovations thereof: St. Andrews University (2013) the world's first to succeed in creating a functioning Tractor beam that pulls objects on a microscopic level
- Macaulayite: Dr. Jeff Wilson of the Macaulay Institute, Aberdeen.

== Sports innovations ==
Scots have been instrumental in the invention and early development of several sports:

- Australian rules football, Scots were prominent with many innovations in the early evolution of the game, including the establishment of the Essendon Football Club by the McCracken family from Ayrshire.
- Several modern athletics events, i.e. shot put and the hammer throw, derive from Highland Games and earlier 12th century Scotland
- Curling
- Gaelic handball, the modern game of handball is first recorded in Scotland in 1427, when King James I, an ardent handball player, had his men block up a cellar window in his palace courtyard that was interfering with his game.
- Golf (see Golf in Scotland)
- Shinty: the history of Shinty as a non-standardised sport pre-dates Scotland the Nation. The rules were standardised in the 19th century by Archibald Chisholm
- Rugby sevens: Ned Haig and David Sanderson (1883)
- The Dugout was invented by Aberdeen FC Coach Donald Colman in the 1920s
- The world's first Robot Olympics which took place in Glasgow in 1990.

== Medical innovations ==
- Pioneering the use of surgical anaesthesia with Chloroform: Firstly in 1842 by Englishman Robert Mortimer Glover then extended for use on humans by Sir James Young Simpson (1811–1870)
- The Saline drip by Dr Thomas Latta of Leith in 1831/32
- The hypodermic syringe: Alexander Wood (1817–1884)
- Independent discovery of inoculation for smallpox: Johnnie Notions (c. 1730 – c. 1803)
- Discovery of hypnotism (November 1841): James Braid (1795–1860)
- General anaesthetic: Pioneered by Scotsman James Young Simpson and Englishman John Snow
- Identifying the cause of brucellosis: Sir David Bruce (1855–1931)
- Discovering the vaccine for typhoid fever: Sir William B. Leishman (1865–1926)
- Electrocardiography: Alexander Muirhead (1869)
- Discovery of Staphylococcus: Sir Alexander Ogston (1880)
- Penicillin: Sir Alexander Fleming in London (1881–1955)
- Pioneering of X-ray cinematography: John Macintyre (1896); the first moving real time X-ray image and the first KUB X-ray diagnostic image of a kidney stone in situ
- Establishment of standardized Ophthalmology: Sir Stewart Duke-Elder, a pioneering Ophthalmologist in the 1930-50s
- The first hospital Radiation therapy unit: John Macintyre (1902); to assist in the diagnosis and treatment of injuries and illness at Glasgow Royal Infirmary
- The Haldane effect, a property of hemoglobin: First described by John Scott Haldane (1907)
- The first Decompression tables: John Scott Haldane (1908); to calculate the safe return of deep-sea divers to surface atmospheric pressure
- Oxygen therapy: John Scott Haldane (1922), with the publication of ‘The Therapeutic Administration of Oxygen Therapy’, beginning the modern era of Oxygen therapy
- Transplant rejection: Professor Thomas Gibson (1940s) the first medical doctor to understand the relationship between donor graft tissue and host tissue rejection and tissue transplantation by his work on aviation burns victims during World War II
- Discovering an effective tuberculosis treatment: Sir John Crofton in the 1950s
- Developing the first beta-blocker drugs: Sir James W. Black in 1964; revolutionized the medical management of angina and is considered to be one of the most important contributions to clinical medicine and pharmacology of the 20th century. In 1988 Black was awarded the Nobel Prize in Medicine.
- Developing modern asthma therapy based both on bronchodilation (salbutamol) and anti-inflammatory steroids (beclomethasone dipropionate): Sir David Jack (1972)
- Chainsaw invented by surgeons John Aitken and James Jeffray for widening the birth canal during difficult childbirth
- Glasgow coma scale: Graham Teasdale and Bryan J. Jennett (1974)
- Glasgow Outcome Scale: Bryan J. Jennett & Sir Michael Bond (1975): diagnostic tool for patients with brain injuries, such as cerebral traumas
- Discovering and developing the anesthetic drug Propofol: Dr. John B. Glen (1977); a globally-used surgical anesthetic common in general surgery cases. In 2018 Dr. Glen received a Lasker Award.
- Glasgow Anxiety Scale: J.Mindham and C.A Espie (2003)
- Glasgow Depression Scale: Fiona Cuthill (2003); the first accurate self-report scale to measure the levels of depression in people with learning disabilities
- Surface Enhanced Raman Scattering (SERS): Strathclyde University (2014); a laser and nanoparticle test to detect Meningitis or multiple pathogenic agents at the same time.

== Household innovations ==
- Joint development of the television: John Logie Baird (1923)
- The refrigerator: William Cullen (1748)
- The vacuum flask: Sir James Dewar (1847–1932)
- The first distiller to triple distill Irish whiskey: (John Jameson)
- The piano footpedal: John Broadwood (1732–1812)
- The first automated can-filling machine John West (1809–1888)
- The waterproof macintosh: Charles Macintosh (1766–1843)
- The kaleidoscope: Sir David Brewster (1781–1868)
- Keiller's marmalade Janet Keiller (1797) - The first recipe of rind suspended marmalade or Dundee marmalade produced in Dundee.
- Lucifer friction match: Sir Isaac Holden (1807–1897) The first commercially successful friction match was invented by John Walker, an chemist and pharmacist in Stockton-on-Tees, England. Holden improved it.
- The self filling pen: Robert Thomson (1822–1873)
- Cotton-reel thread: J & J Clark of Paisley
- Lime cordial: Lauchlan Rose in 1867
- Bovril beef extract: John Lawson Johnston in 1874
- Chemical Telegraph (Automatic Telegraphy) Alexander Bain (1846) In England Bain's telegraph was used on the wires of the Electric Telegraph Company to a limited extent, and in 1850 it was used in America.
- Barr's Irn-Bru, soft drink produced by Barr's in Cumbernauld Scotland and exported all around the world. The drink is so widely popular in Scotland that it outsells both American colas Coca-Cola and Pepsi and ranks 3rd most popular drink in the UK with Coca-Cola and Pepsi taking the first two spots.

== Weapons innovations ==
- The carronade cannon: Robert Melville (1723–1809)
- The Ferguson rifle: Patrick Ferguson in 1770
- The Lee bolt system as used in the Lee–Metford and Lee–Enfield series rifles: James Paris Lee
- The Ghillie suit pioneered by the Lovat Scouts
- The percussion cap: invented by Scottish Presbyterian clergyman Alexander Forsyth

== Miscellaneous innovations ==
- Boys' Brigade: Sir William Alexander Smith
- Grand Theft Auto: developed by Scottish game developers DMA Design (later known as Rockstar North)
- Joint development in colour photography: the first known permanent colour photograph was taken by Scotsman James Clerk Maxwell (1831–1879) and Englishman Thomas Sutton (1810–1875)
- Buick Motor Company by David Dunbar Buick
- Pinkerton National Detective Agency by Allan Pinkerton
- Fried chicken: the origin of fried chicken in the southern states of America has been traced to precedents in Scottish cuisine.
- The establishment of a standardized botanical institute: Isaac Bayley Balfour
- London School of Hygiene & Tropical Medicine: founded by Sir Patrick Manson in 1899

== See also ==
- List of British innovations and discoveries
- List of English inventions and discoveries
- List of domesticated Scottish breeds
- List of Welsh inventors
- Homecoming Scotland 2009
- Timeline of Irish inventions and discoveries
- Science in Medieval Western Europe
