= List of English inventors and designers =

This is a list of English inventors and designers.

== A ==
- Roma Agrawal, structural engineer who contributed to the design of The Shard building in London
- Sir Richard Arkwright (1732–1792) invented the spinning frame (also known as the water frame)
- Joseph Aspdin (1788–1855), Portland cement

== B ==
- Roger Bacon (1214–1292), magnifying glass
- Edward Barber (1969– ), London 2012 Olympic Torch
- Julia Barfield (1952– ), architect who contributed to the design of the London Eye and the i360 observation tower in Brighton, England
- Trevor Baylis (1937–2018), wind-up radio
- Tim Berners-Lee (1955– ), World Wide Web

== C ==
- Margaret Calvert (1936– ), graphic designer who designed (with Jock Kinneir) many of the road signs used throughout the United Kingdom
- Edmund Cartwright (1743–1823) invented the power loom
- George Cayley (1773–1854), man-carrying glider, tension spoke wheels, hot air engine, continuous track "universal railway" vehicle propulsion system
- Imran Chaudhri (1973– ) invented the user interface and interactions of the iPhone, also worked on the Mac, iPod, iPad, Apple TV and Apple Watch
- John Clark (1785–1853) invented the first automated poetry generator, The Eureka, and patented a method to waterproof fabric for air beds and air cushions in 1813.
- Terence Conran (1931–2020), Design Museum founder
- Ilse Crawford (born 1962), interior and furniture designer
- Samuel Crompton (1753–1827) invented the spinning mule

== D ==
- Sir Humphry Davy, 1st Baronet (1778–1829), chemist and inventor of the Davy lamp and an early form of arc lamp
- Rick Dickinson (c. 1957–2018), designer of early computers, the touch-sensitive keyboard, as well as the rubber keyboard of the ZX Spectrum
- Sir James Dyson (b. 1947) invented the bagless vacuum cleaner

== F ==
- Michael Faraday (1791–1867), electric transformer
- John Ambrose Fleming (1848–1945), vacuum diode
- Tommy Flowers (1905–1998), Colossus computer, an early electronic computer
- Norman Foster (1935– ), prominent architect and designer, multiple patent holder
- Samson Fox (1838–1903) invented the corrugated boiler flue
- William Friese-Greene (1855–1921), cinematography

== G ==
- Kenneth Grange (1929– ), industrial design including the InterCity 125

== H ==
- James Hargreaves (c. 1720–1778) invented the spinning jenny
- Sir John Harington (d. 1612) invented the first modern flushing toilet
- John Harrison (1693–1776), marine chronometer
- Rowland Hill (1795–1879), postage stamp
- Frank Hornby (1863–1936), Meccano

== I ==
- Jonathan Ive (1967– ), former Chief Design Officer of Apple Inc., multiple patent holder

== K ==
- Tom Karen (1926–2022), industrial designer who designed cars, bicycles, and radios in the 1970s
- Jock Kinneir (1917–1994), graphic designer who designed (with Margaret Calvert) many of the road signs used throughout the United Kingdom

== M ==
- George William Manby (1765–1854), fire extinguisher
- David Marks, architect who contributed to the design of the London Eye and the i360 observation tower in Brighton, England
- Jasper Morrison (1959– ), prominent English industrial designer known as the co-originator (with Naoto Fukasawa) of "super-normalism"

== N ==
- Thomas Newcomen (1664–1729) invented the atmospheric engine
- Isaac Newton (1642–1727), reflecting telescope

== O ==
- Jay Osgerby (1969– ), London 2012 Olympic Torch

== P ==
- Alexander Parkes (1831–1890), celluloid
- Stephen Perry, rubber band
- George Pocock (1774–1843) invented the 'Charvolant' (a kite-drawn carriage)
- Joseph Priestley (1733–1804), soda water

== R ==
- Andrew Ritchie (1947– ), Brompton bicycle

== S ==
- John Sheppard (1922–2015), automotive designer and co-designer (with Alec Issigonis) of both the Mini and the Mini Moke
- Henry Shrapnel (1761–1842), shrapnel shell ammunition
- George Sowden, (1942– ), prominent English industrial designer, holder of multiple patents
- George Stephenson (1781–1848) mechanical and civil engineer, inventor of the Geordie lamp
- Jedediah Strutt (1726–1797) invented the Derby Rib machine
- Sir Joseph Swan (1828–1914) physicist, chemist and inventor of an early incandescent lightbulb

== T ==
- Henry Fox Talbot (1800–1877) invented the salt print and calotype photographic processes
- J.J. Thomson (1856–1940), mass spectrometer
- Jethro Tull (1674–1740), horse-drawn seed drill

== W ==
- Edward Craven Walker (1918–2000) invented the lava lamp
- Barnes Wallis (1887–1979), bouncing bomb
- Josiah Wedgwood (1730–1795) invented jasperware
- Edward Weston (1850–1936), Weston cell
- Frank Whittle (1907–1996), co-inventor of the jet engine
- William Winlaw (d.1796), patented agricultural machinery
- Arthur Wynne (1862–1945), inventor of crossword puzzle

== See also ==
- List of British innovations and discoveries
- List of Cornish engineers and inventors
- List of Cornish scientists
- List of English inventions and discoveries
- List of industrial designers
- List of Welsh inventors
