= Rex Paterson =

British businessman (1902–1978)

Rex Paterson in 1965

Rex Munro Paterson OBE (1902 in London – 1978 in Hampshire) was an English agricultural pioneer whose extensive business and meticulous record keeping enabled him to carry out research and development in dairy farming systems on a scale that would have been beyond most research institutions.

== Biography ==
The son of a clergyman, he was educated at Christ's Hospital and spent only a short time at Wye College. He spent some time learning technical drawing in the office of his uncle Alliott Verdon Roe, the aviation pioneer, before leaving to farm in Canada. The economic climate was not favourable and he returned to England, grateful that he could afford the fare.

He rented a farm in Kent, where he depended considerably on rabbiting to make a living. A move to the free-draining chalk downland of Hampshire enabled him to start milking cows using the system developed by Wiltshire dairy farmer Arthur Hosier. The cows were kept out all year and milked in "bails", or mobile milking parlours, which offered a very cheap way of starting up a dairy herd. Paterson started milking with a bail in 1928 (milking the cows himself) and built up a farming empire which came to include up to 10,000 acres (40 km²) (in 1943), and 4,000 dairy cows (in the early 1970s).

He became a well-known (if controversial) figure in British agriculture. His entrepreneurial drive and evident success, particularly in the 1930s and 1940s, contrasted strongly with the generally depressed state of British farming, and made him a source of inspiration to younger innovative farmers in the 1950s and 1960s. He showed that large scale farming, using modern technology, was both possible and profitable under British conditions.

He was appointed OBE in 1964 for services to agriculture and in 1965 was awarded the Massey Ferguson National Award for Services to United Kingdom Agriculture.

== Labour management ==
Paterson took a different approach to the labour problems which had troubled other farmers. He did not set up large herds, typically his herds had 40–60 cows (this increased to around 80 in the 1960s). This meant that the herd could be looked after by a single stockman, who was given considerable responsibility.

In 1965 Paterson set out his principles for labour management:

- create the best possible working conditions;
- isolate the stockman and his unit, "so that he has the maximum opportunity to show his ability" and to "see how his results compare with others working under similar conditions";
- "encourage an employee to accept as much responsibility as possible"
- "give the opportunity to increase earnings by bonus payments";
- "give them the opportunity to act as if they were self-employed, and the freedom to use their own initiative within the framework of the general policy".

Paterson was an innovator in the development of management systems and the organisation of labour as well as in the use of technology. He offered his workers greater responsibility and motivated them by bonus payments, at a time when other farmers were trying to solve problems through stricter management control.

== Inventions ==
=== Management tools ===
Paterson invented a simple milk graph, in which a calculation of potential milk production, using a system he had developed from his study of herd results over the years, was compared to actual production for each herd. He also developed a system of measuring grass output which he called the Cow Day System.

=== Taskers-Paterson Buckrake ===
He was a pioneer in the making of silage in Britain and to enable this he designed the Buckrake and the Muckrake, which exploited the hydraulic three-point linkage invented by Harry Ferguson. This was manufactured by the firm of Taskers of Andover.

=== Taskers-Paterson Fertispread ===
A trailed spreader which used the constant speed of a hydraulic motor to spread, at a constant width, fertiliser metered by a chain driven from a land wheel.

== Business philosophy ==
He once said he "was never afraid to question the reasons for commonly accepted practices. We would find ways of measuring everything which occurred. As our business developed, we found that many things in farming followed unexpected, but clearly defined patterns. This particularly related to the influence of men and feeds on milk yields."
