= James Goodfellow =

British engineer

- Born: 1937 (age 87-88); Paisley, Renfrewshire, Scotland, United Kingdom
- Known for: Inventing the PIN and modern ATM

James Goodfellow OBE (born 1937) is a Scottish inventor. In 1966, he patented personal identification number (PIN) technology and an automated teller machine (ATM). He is generally considered the inventor of the modern ATM.

Goodfellow was born in Paisley, Renfrewshire, where he later attended St Mirin's Academy. As a 28-year-old development engineer at Kelvin Hughes, he was given the project of developing an automatic cash dispenser in 1965. His system accepted a machine readable encrypted card, with a numerical PIN keypad. The invention received UK Patent No. 1,197,183 with a priority date of 2 May 1966. In 1967, the world's first ATM was at Barclays Bank in Enfield, north London, which used a rival design by John Shepherd-Barron of De La Rue that accepted cheques impregnated with a radioactive chemical. De La Rue did not patent the design.

In 2005, Shepherd-Barron was widely reported as the inventor of the cash dispenser after he received an OBE. This compelled Goodfellow to publicize his patent. "[Shepherd-Barron] invented a radioactive device to withdraw money. I invented an automated system with an encrypted card and a pin number, and that's the one that is used around the world today," he said. Despite being appointed an OBE in the 2006 Queen's Birthday Honours for his invention of the personal identification number, Goodfellow has publicly commented on the lack of recognition and compensation for his inventiveness, since PIN codes are ubiquitous today.

Goodfellow, a Fellow of the Institution of Electrical Engineers, was inducted into the Scottish Engineering Hall of Fame in 2016. In 2011, BBC Radio Scotland broadcast Goodfellow's oral account of the history of his invention, rebroadcast in 2022.

== See also ==
- Scottish inventions and discoveries
