= Aethrioscope =

An aethrioscope (or æthrioscope) is a meteorological device invented by Sir John Leslie in 1818 for measuring the chilling effect of a clear sky. The name is from the Greek αίθριος (aíthrios, "fair, cloudless, bright and sunny") and σκοπέω (skopéō, "look at, examine").

It consists of a metallic cup standing upon a tall hollow pedestal, with a differential thermometer placed so that one of its bulbs is in the focus of the paraboloid formed by the cavity of the cup. The interior of the cup is highly polished and is kept covered by a plate of metal, being opened when an observation is made. The second bulb is always screened from the sky and so is not affected by the radiative effect of the clear sky, the action of which is concentrated upon the first bulb. The contraction of the air in the second bulb by its sudden exposure to a clear sky causes the liquid in the stem to rise.

The device will respond in a contrary fashion when exposed to heat radiation and so may be used as a pyrometer too.
