= James Smith (inventor) =

Scottish inventor (1789–1850)

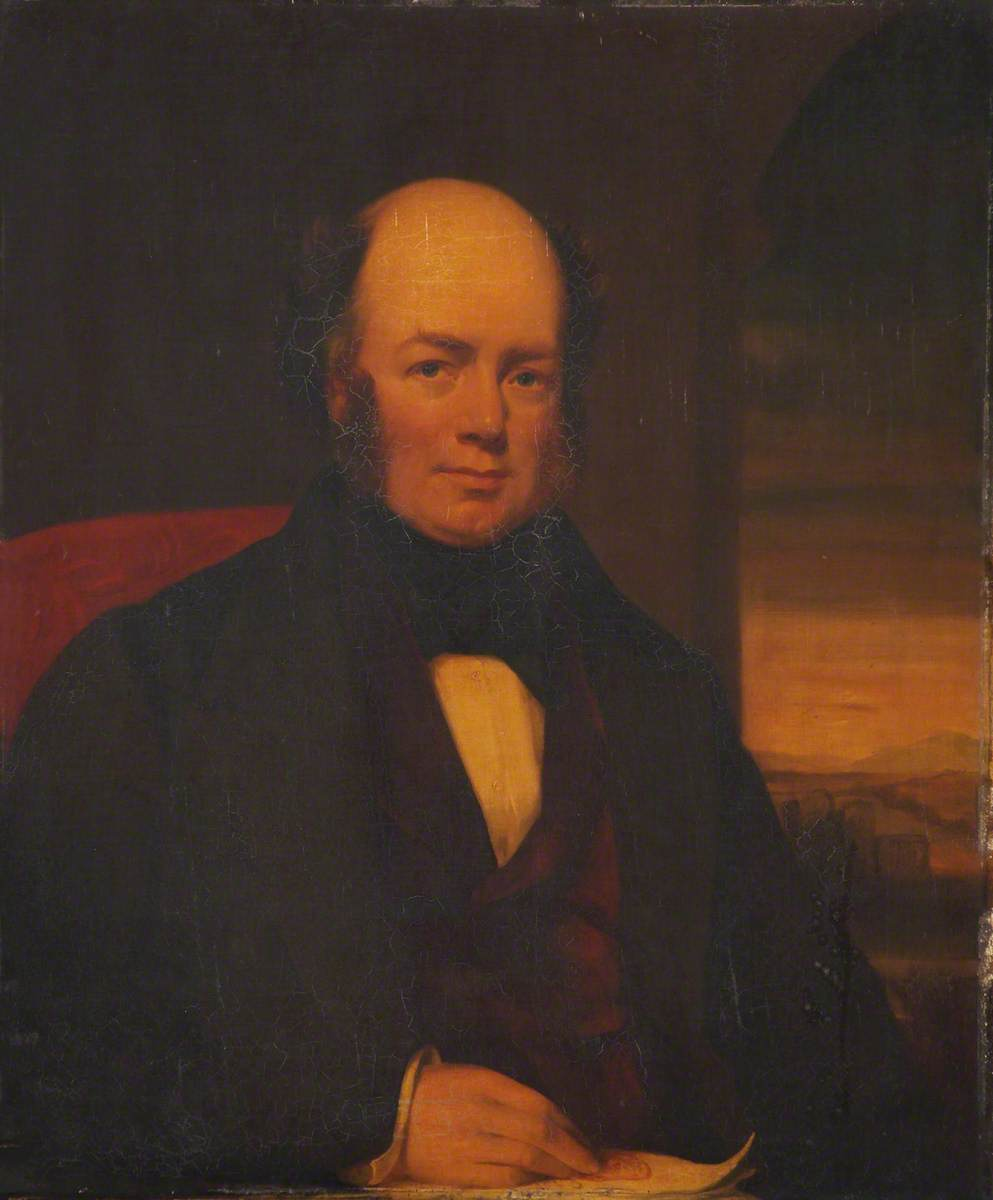

James Smith (3 January 1789 – 10 June 1850) was a Scottish inventor whose inventions include a reaping machine, a subsoil plough and the first endless chain of flats for carding.

Smith's father, a self-made Glasgow businessman, died when he was two months old; his mother went to live with her brother, a friend and pupil of Richard Arkwright, and managing partner of cotton-works at Deanston. Smith attended Glasgow University before entering his uncle's factory and becoming manager aged 18. Aged 24, his invention of the reaping machine won him a medal from the Imperial Agricultural Society of St Petersburgh. In 1823 Smith came into possession of his uncle's farm, and set about systematically draining the soil and working it with a subsoil plough. In 1831 he published his agricultural recommendations as a small pamphlet, Thorough Draining and Deep Working, which attracted attention in the agricultural crisis of 1834.

Smith also introduced mechanical innovations in spinning: in 1834 he improved Archibald Buchanan's self-stripping card, filing a patent (British patent no. 6560) for fixing the flat cards on an endless chain, allowing them to be regularly cleaned.

Smith was appointed by Robert Peel to the Commission into the sanitation and health of manufacturing towns, which led to the 1848 Public Health Act: Smith pressed to make liquid manure useful to agriculture. Smith was also an active member of the Royal Agricultural Improvement Society of Ireland, and a member of the Glasgow Philosophical Society, contributing papers to their Transactions.
