= Graham Teasdale (physician) =

English neurosurgeon

Sir Graham Michael Teasdale FRCP FRCS (born 23 September 1940) is an English neurosurgeon and the co-developer of the neurologic assessment tool known as the Glasgow Coma Scale. He is an Honorary Professor in Mental Health and Wellbeing in the Institute of Health and Wellbeing at the University of Glasgow Medical School.

== Biography ==
Born in Spennymoor, County Durham, Teasdale attended medical school at the University of Durham, graduating MB, BS in 1963. He has been associated with the University of Glasgow Medical School since the 1960s.

In 1974, Teasdale co-created the Glasgow Coma Scale (GCS) with Bryan Jennett. The GCS is a method of assessing a patient's level of consciousness.

After serving as president of the Society of British Neurological Surgeons from 2000 to 2002, he was president of the Royal College of Physicians and Surgeons of Glasgow from 2003 to 2006. He was made a Knight Bachelor in 2006. He received the 2014 Distinguished Service Award from the American Association of Neurological Surgeons.
