= Bryan Jennett =

British neurosurgeon

- Bryan Jennett in his office.
- Born: 1 March 1926; Twickenham, England, United Kingdom
- Died: 26 January 2008 (aged 81); Glasgow, Scotland, United Kingdom
- Education: University of Liverpool School of Medicine
- Known for: Glasgow Coma Scale
- Scientific career
- Fields: Neurosurgery
- Workplaces: University of California, Los Angeles, University of Glasgow

William Bryan Jennett CBE (1 March 1926 – 26 January 2008) was an English neurosurgeon, a faculty member at the University of Glasgow Medical School, and the first full-time chair of neurosurgery in Scotland. He was the co-developer of the assessment tool known as the Glasgow Coma Scale and made advancements in the care of patients with brain injuries. in 1972, Jennett and the neurologist Fred Plum coined the term vegetative state.

== Early life ==
Jennett was born and raised in Twickenham to Irish and Scottish parents. Jennett was evacuated from Twickenham during the Second World War. He first moved to rural Scotland and later to Southport, Lancashire where he attended King George V Grammar School before training as a doctor at the University of Liverpool.

== Education and early career ==
Jennett studied at Liverpool Medical School. He finished top of his year and was President of the national British Medical Students Association. Jennett's first mentor in medicine, Henry Cohen, 1st Baron Cohen of Birkenhead, encouraged him toward a career in neurosurgery. He went on to take posts at Oxford, Cardiff and Manchester as well as a spell in the Royal Army Medical Corps.

His academic interests were not congruent with the times and he was turned down for promotion in Oxford, Manchester and Dundee. He believed that the NHS at the time placed too much emphasis on patronage and were not supportive of academic interests. He considered a permanent move to America after a one-year Rockefeller Fellowship at UCLA, but was headhunted in 1963 for a new combined NHS/University position in Glasgow. Over the next ten years he became a Professor and moved to a purpose built unit at the Southern General Hospital.

Prior to moving to Glasgow, Jennett published work on epilepsy following head injuries. He published Introduction to Neurosurgery in 1964.

== Later career ==
Jennett set up a prospective computerised data bank to collect the features and outcome of head injuries. Data was compiled from Glasgow, the United States, and the Netherlands over a long period and led to a series of papers in the 1970s, the introduction of the near universally adopted Glasgow Coma Scale (GCS) with Graham Teasdale, and the Glasgow Outcome Scale with Bond. In 1972 working with Dr Plum of America, Jennett published The Persistent Vegetative State – defining a condition and coining a phrase which remains in widespread use today. His work with the Glasgow-based Neuropathologists Adams and Graham significantly reduced mortality and disability. Many international collaborative studies followed, comparing outcomes after different severity of injury and with alternative therapeutic regimes.

In 1976 there was furore over a BBC Panorama Programme which questioned the criteria for the establishment of brain death in potential organ donors. Jennett was in demand as a speaker and in the UK contributed to medical panels and was called to Court as an expert witness, most notably for the Tony Bland case.

Jennett was Dean of Medicine at Glasgow in the 1980s. He worked with Barbara Stocking and Chris Ham of the King's Fund to establish a series of Consensus Conferences to deal with the appropriate use of high-cost medical technology.

He was President of the International Society for Technology Assessment and in 1984 he published High Technology Medicine: Benefits and Burdens followed a series of BBC talks Doctors, Patients & Responsibilities which were widely praised.

In 1988 he developed deep-vein thrombosis (DVT) which he blamed on the cramped seating on an aircraft. Along with colleagues who had similar experiences, he published a short paper in The Lancet. This was the first use of the term "economy-class syndrome".

Jennett retired in 1991. In his later years, he was named Commander of the Order of the British Empire (CBE) and received an honorary doctorate from St Andrews University. His continuing work included a 2002 monograph, The Vegetative State, and his final publication appeared in the British Journal of Neurosurgery in 2008. He died a few weeks after that final publication, having been diagnosed with multiple myeloma five years earlier. His wife Sheila and his three children survived him.

== Sources ==
- Sir Graham Teasdale and Sam Galbraith (2 February 2008). "Bryan Jennett". The Herald.
- Ken Lindsay (19 March 2008). "Bryan Jennett". The Guardian. London.
- Caroline Richmond and Graham Teasdale (1 March 2008). "William Bryan Jennett". British Medical Journal. 336 (7642): 512. doi:10.1136/bmj.39500.632384.BE. PMC 2258384.
