= Macaulayite =

Phyllosilicate mineral

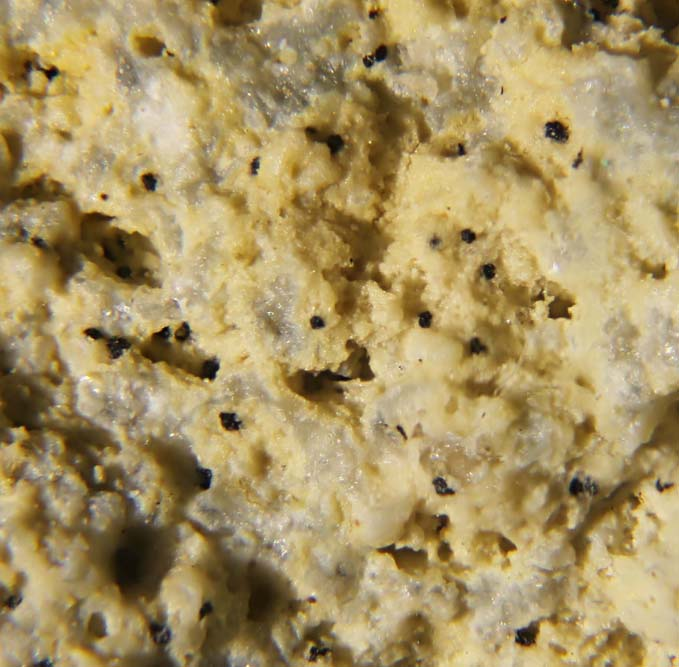
- Macaulayite found in the United Kingdom

General
- Category: Phyllosilicate minerals
- Formula: (Fe^{3+},Al)_{24}Si_{4}O_{43}(OH)_{2}
- IMA symbol: Mcy
- Strunz classification: 9.EC.65
- Crystal system: Monoclinic; Unknown space group

Identification
- Formula mass: 2,116.93 g/mol
- Colour: red
- Crystal habit: Earthy – Dull, clay-like texture with no visible crystalline affinities
- Lustre: earthy
- Streak: light red
- Density: 4.41

Macaulayite is a red, earthy, monoclinic mineral, with the chemical formula (Fe^{3+},Al)_{24}Si_{4}O_{43}(OH)_{2}. It was discovered in the 1970s by Jeff Wilson and named after the Macaulay Institute in Aberdeen, Scotland. The only known source of macaulayite in the world is a quarry at the foot of Bennachie, Aberdeenshire, and it is formed by granite which has been weathered by tropical climates from before the last ice age. The substance is currently being studied by NASA, as it is speculated that this is the substance which gives the planet Mars its colour and it could prove that life on Mars can be sustained.

== Study by NASA ==
The American space agency NASA is currently carrying out studies on macaulayite, as they believe that the substance might be present on the planet Mars. NASA scientists speculate that macaulayite may be what gives the planet its red colour. Also, as macaulayite is formed in the presence of water, the existence of the mineral on Mars may help to prove that the planet could contain resources needed to sustain life.

In an interview with the BBC, Wilson said: "It is exciting because this particular mineral contains water. It's a very fine grain mineral and water is bound to the inner surfaces. There's been a lot of speculation about the occurrence of water on Mars. We don't know but it could be associated with this mineral."

Janice Bishop, a Mars specialist from the Search for Extra Terrestrial Intelligence Institute also told the BBC that: "All life forms as we know it require liquid water so if we can actually find periods of time or places on the planet where there was standing water then the chance of life having formed increase greatly."
