= William Ged =

Scottish goldsmith (1699 - 1749)

William Ged (1699 – 19 October 1749) was a Scottish goldsmith who has been credited with the invention of stereotyping. However, he was not the first to use the process.

Ged was born in Edinburgh, where he carried on business as a goldsmith. In 1725 he patented his process, and tried but failed to persuade printers in Edinburgh to take up his invention. In 1729 he endeavoured to push his new process of printing, on which he was still working, in London by joining in partnership with a stationer and a type-founder but, disappointed in his workmen and his partners, he returned despondent to Edinburgh. Although he had offers for use of his process from Dutch printers, he turned them down from patriotic motives.

He died in poverty in Edinburgh and was buried in Greyfriars Kirkyard. The grave was unmarked. An edition of Sallust and two prayer-books (for the University of Cambridge) were stereotyped by him.
