= Tree shelter =

Structure to protect young trees

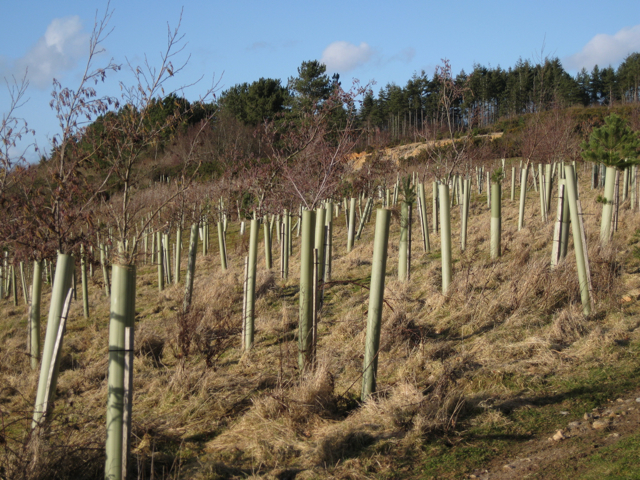
Young trees sheltered by plastic tubes

A tree shelter, tree guard or tree tube, also Tuley tube after their inventor, is a structure used in tree planting, arboriculture and tree care that protects planted tree saplings from browsing animals and other dangers as the trees grow.

The purpose of tree shelters is to protect young trees from browsing by herbivores by forming a physical barrier along with providing a barrier to chemical spray applications. Additionally, tree tubes accelerate growth by providing a mini-greenhouse environment that reduces moisture stress, channels growth into the main stem and roots and allows efficient control of weeds that can rob young seedlings of soil moisture and sunlight. Young trees protected in this way have a survival rate of around 85%, but without a tree guard only about half of all planted trees grow to adulthood.

Wrought iron, wire and wooden tree guards were used in Victorian England since the 1820s, but not always because of their cost. Plastic tube tree shelters were invented in Scotland in 1979 by Graham Tuley. They are particularly popular in the UK in landscape-scale planting schemes and their use has been established in the United States since 2000. About 1 million shelters were in use in the United Kingdom in 1983–1984, and 10 million were produced in 1991.

Many variations of tree shelters exist. There is considerable debate among tree shelter manufacturers as to the ideal colour, size, shape and texture for optimal plant growth. One style used in northern climates of North America has a height of 1.5 m (5 ft) to offer the best protection from deer browse, with vent holes in the upper portion of the tube to allow for hardening off of hardwood trees going into the winter months, and no vent holes in the lower portion to shield seedlings from herbicide spray and rodent damage.

The use of plastic tube tree shelters leads to the contamination of the environment with microplastics as the tubes, which are normally not collected, degrade over time. For this reason, biodegradable, plastic-free options are becoming available in the market. Other alternatives include wooden or metal fencing to keep animals out.

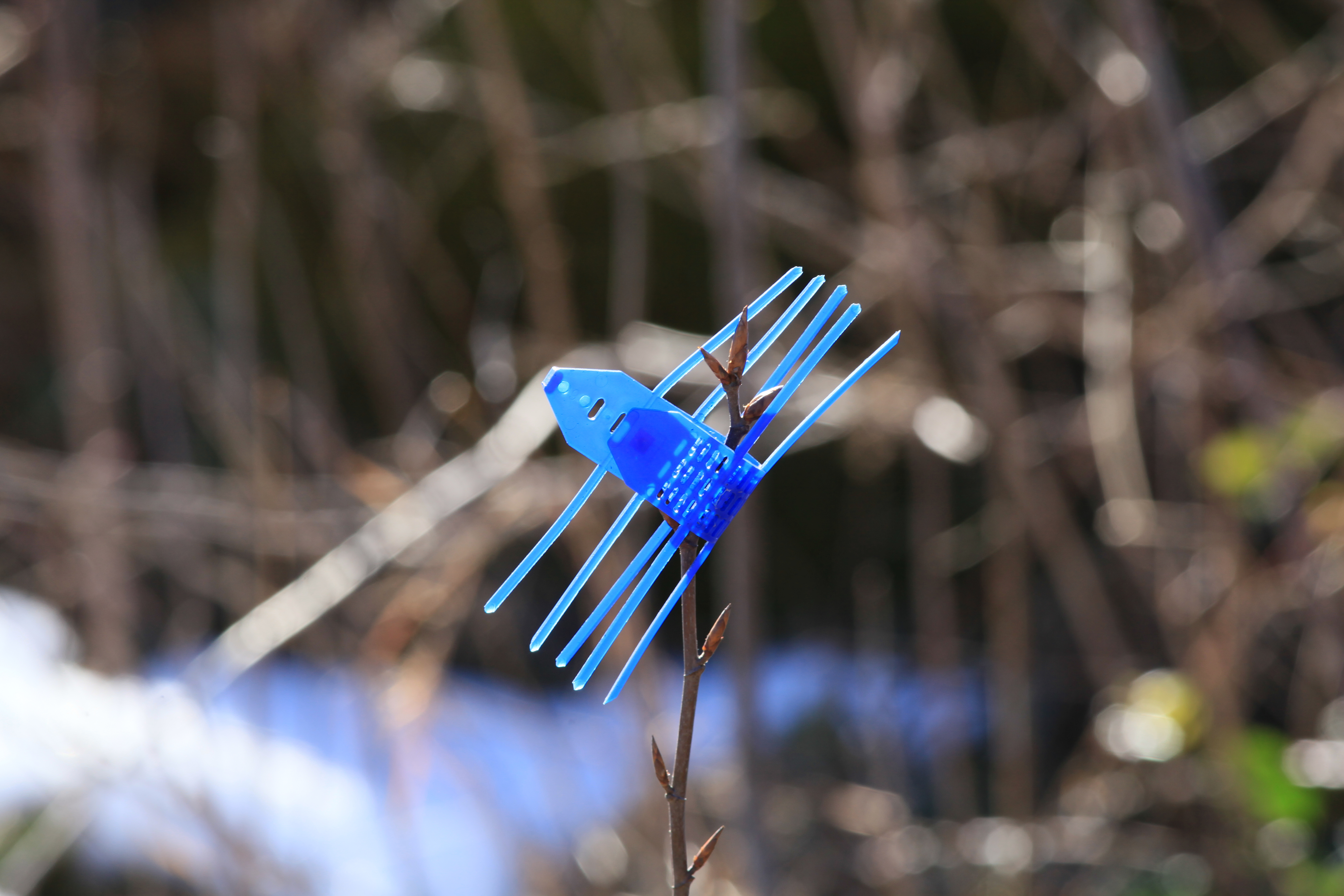
Plastic protector for the shoot in Germany, alternatively a wad of sheep's wool can also be used

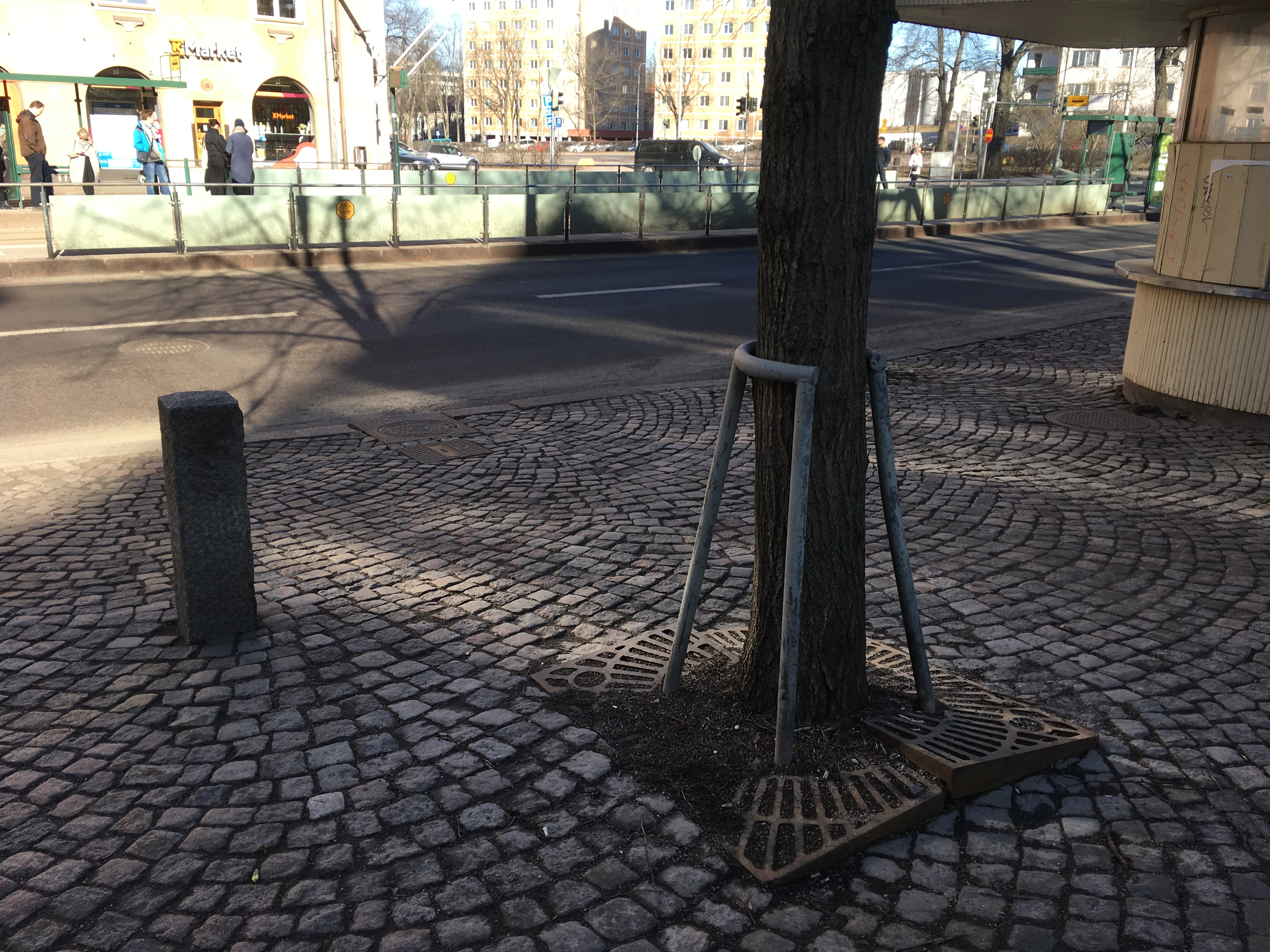
Tree guard that now cannot be removed intact due to the growth of the trunk, Helsinki

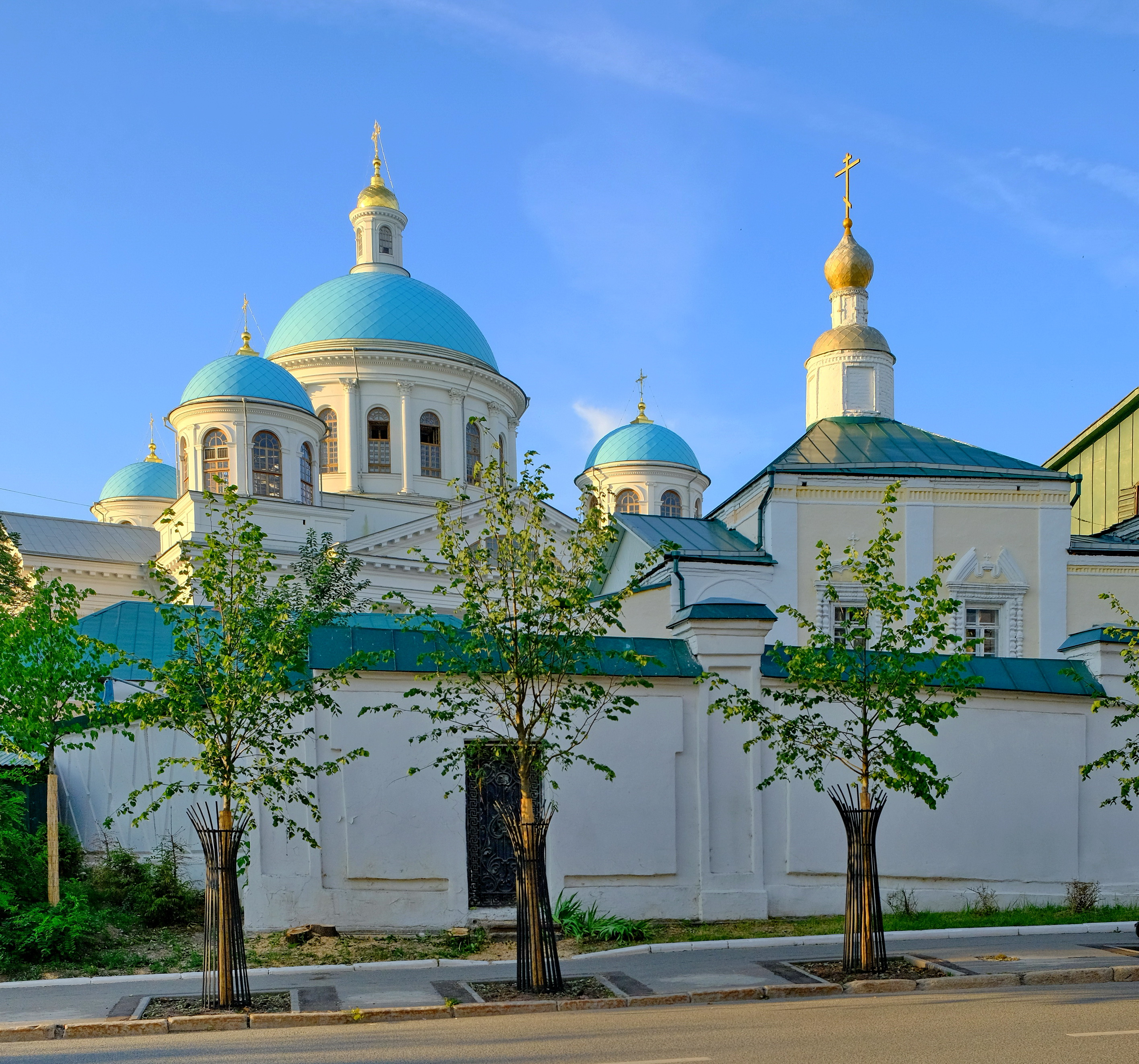
Iron tree guards in Russia

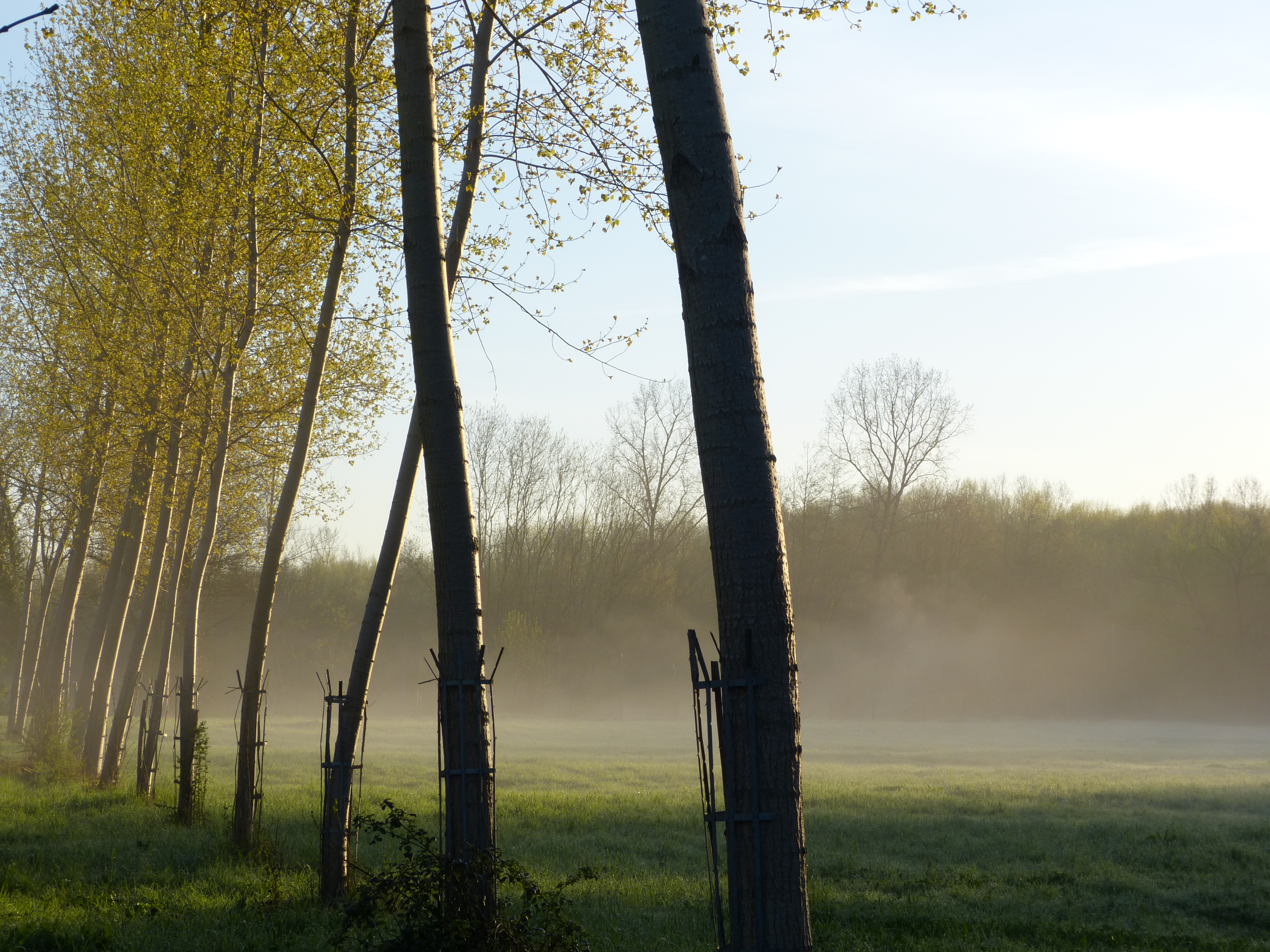
Bark protectors from thin metal strips in France

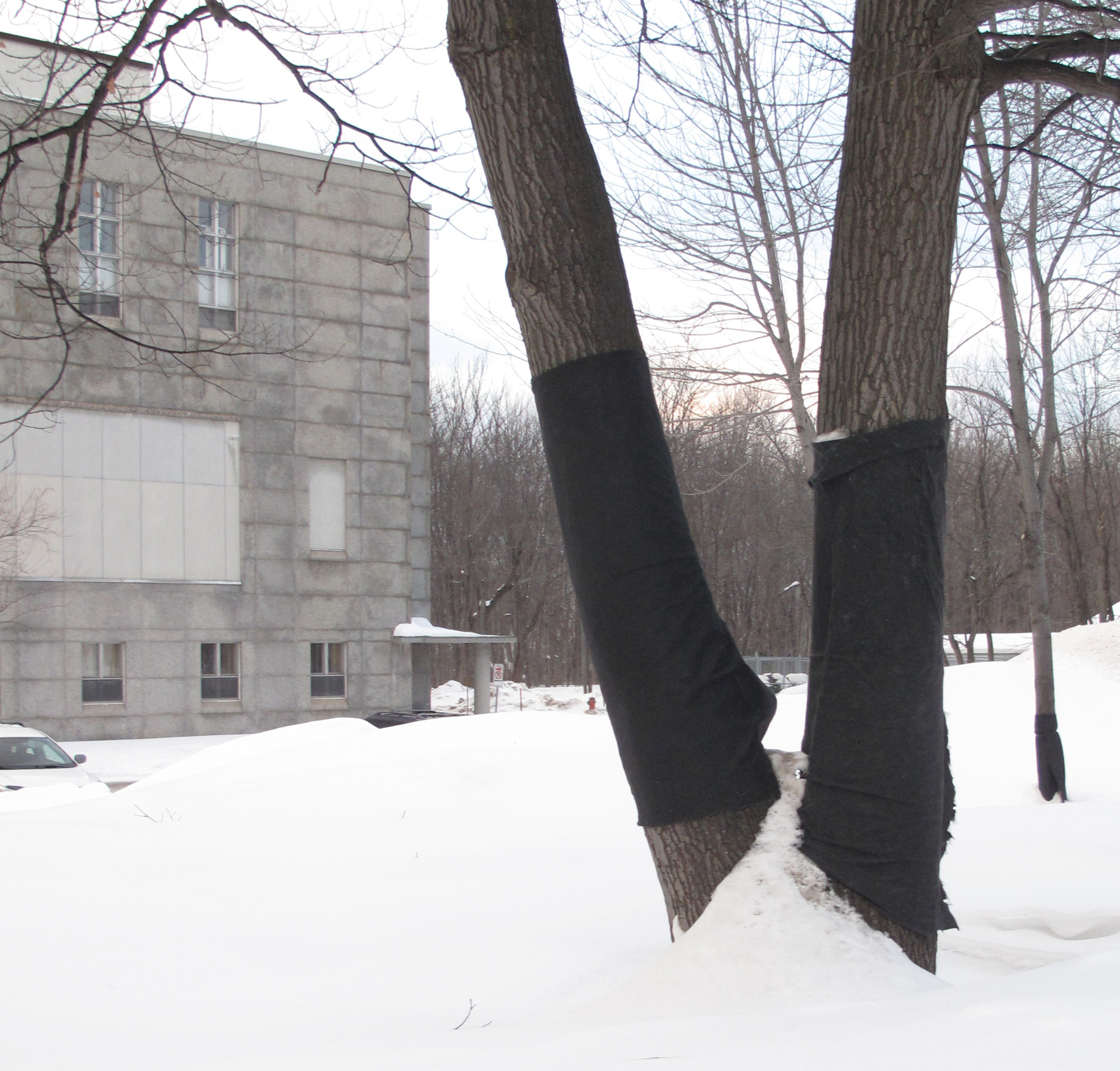
Frost protection for a Northern red oak in France

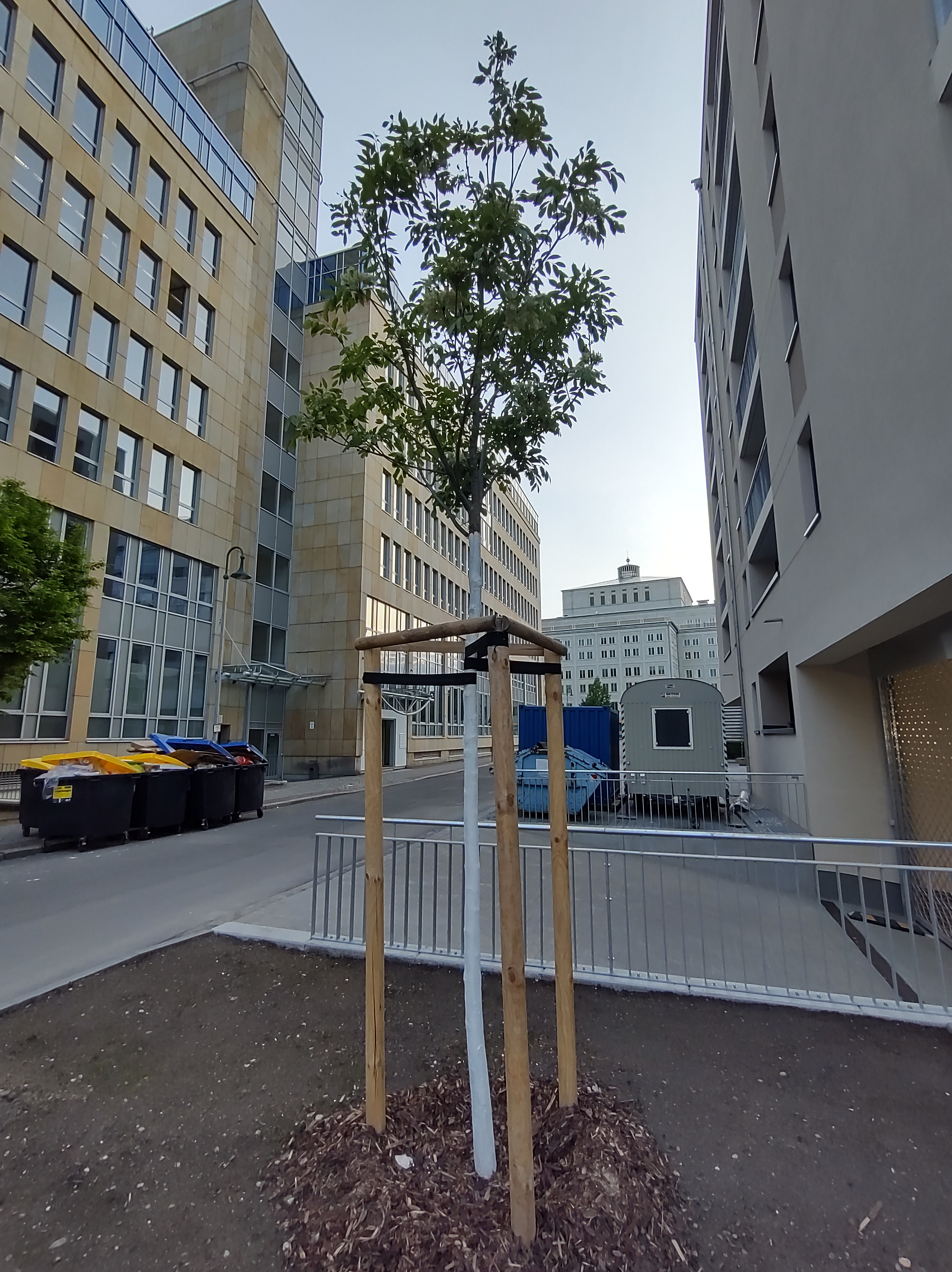
Triangular tree shelter made from thin logs in Leipzig, Germany

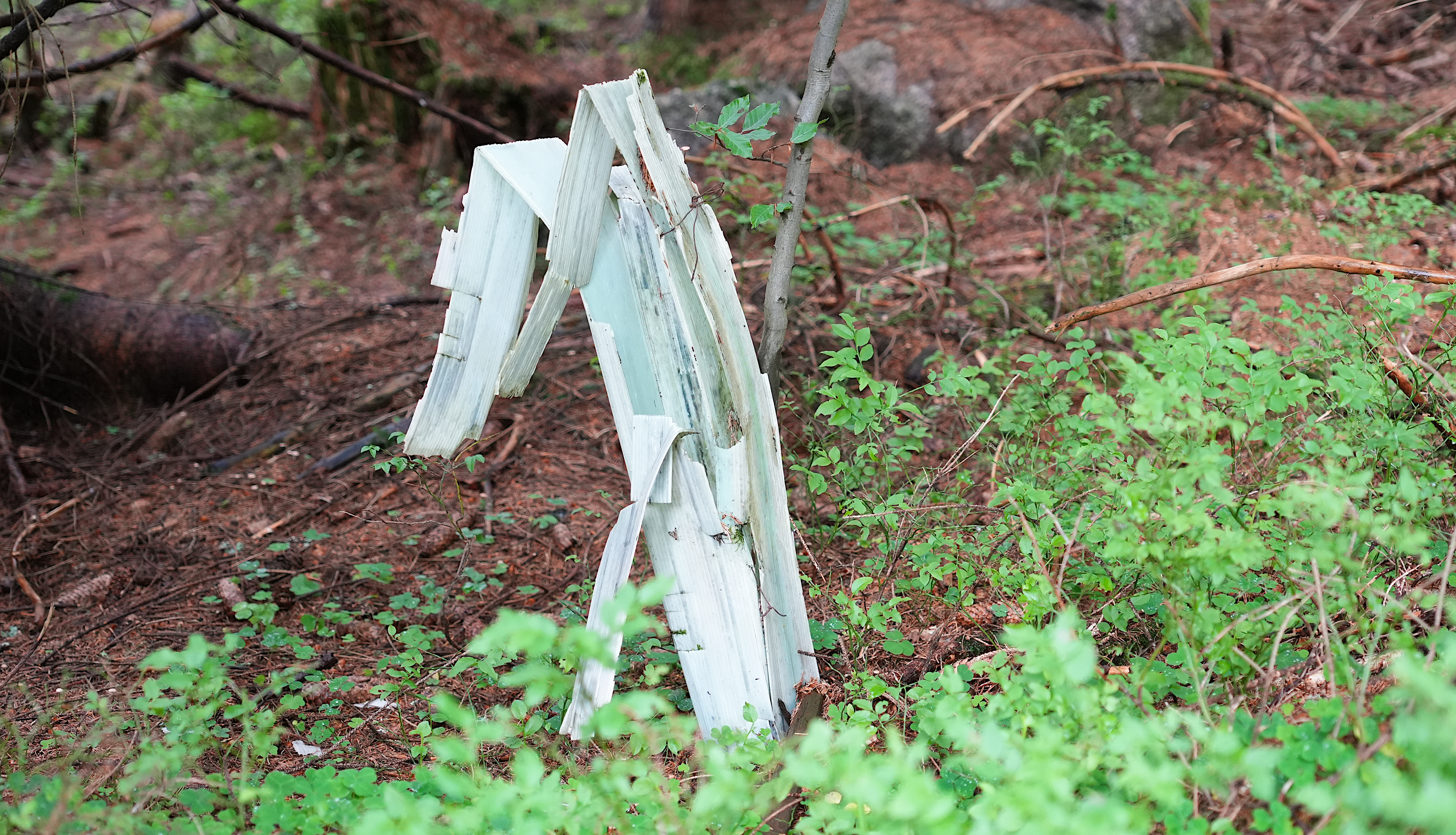
A decaying tree guard in the Jizera Mountains, Czech Republic
