= List of Welsh inventors =

This is a list of people of Welsh origin who are recognised as innovators or inventors who have made notable contributions to technical or theoretical world advancements.

- Edward George Bowen pioneer of radar. Worked at 'Woomera Rocket Testing Base' in Australia. Born in Gendros, Swansea.
- David Brunt pioneer of modern meteorology. Head of Meteorological Office, secretary of Royal Society From Penfforddlas, Wales.
- Martha Hughes Cannon pioneer in women and children's medicine. The State of Utah's Health Department is named in her honour. Born in Llandudno, Wales.
- Archie Cochrane Founder of Cochrane Collaboration, Cochrane library, Cochrane reviews. UK Cochrane Centre in Oxford. Conducted much of his groundbreaking medical research in Wales.
- Alan Cox is a programmer heavily involved in the development of the Linux kernel since 1991.
- Sir Clifford Darby, geographer and leader in promoting the relationships between geography and other subjects. Knighted in 1988. Born in Neath, South Wales.
- Donald Davies Proposed and developed packet switching, an important technology of the Internet. Born in Treorchy, Rhondda, Wales.
- Walter Davies (inventor), along with his brother Thomas, invented the 'Stepney Spare Wheel' used on almost all early motor cars. Born in Llanelli, South Wales
- John Dee Founder of the new school of English mathematical scientists in the 16th century. One of the greatest polymaths of all time. Born in Buallt, Radnor.
- Bill Frost Welsh carpenter who patented the aeroplane in 1894 and took to the skies in a powered flying machine the following year, eight years before the Wright brothers attempt at Kitty Hawk. Born in Tenby.
- William Robert Grove Invented the fuel cell. Born in Swansea, 1811.
- John T. Houghton Distinguished meteorologist. Inspiration behind major international conferences on global warming (Rio, Kyoto, Buenos Aires). Born in Wales.
- David E. Hughes First transmission of radio waves. Inventor of the microphone and printing telegraph system. A musician and philosopher. Born Corwen, Wales.
- John Gwyn Jeffreys conchologist (someone who studies shells). He helped pioneer deep-sea dredging. He corresponded with Charles Darwin and was involved with a number of scientific associations. Born into a long-established Welsh family.
- Ernest Jones Introduced psychoanalysis into Britain and North America. Born in Llwchwy, South Wales.
- Samuel Milton Jones Inventor, writer and Mayor of Toledo, Ohio, USA. Born in Caernarfonshire.
- Steve Jones Professor of genetics at the Galton Laboratory and University College, London. Born in Wales.
- William Jones A noted mathematician, published author and early naval navigator. First to use 'Pi' (1706) as a mathematical symbol. Born in Llanfihangel Tre'r Beirdd.
- Brian Josephson Nobel Prize–winning physicist; gave his name to the superconducting Josephson junction. Born Cardiff.
- Bernard Knight Forensic pathologist, barrister and writer. Creator of the 'Crowner John' series, historic crime fiction. As a forensic pathologist, worked on the infamous Fred West case, recovering all twelve bodies. Born and spent most of his life in Cardiff.
- Francis Lewis Signatory of the US 'Declaration of Independence' as one of the representatives from New York. Born in Llandaff.
- Sir Thomas Lewis Born in Taffs Well, (26 December 1881 – 17 March 1945) was a British cardiologist (although he personally disliked the term, preferring cardiovascular disease specialist). He coined the term "clinical science".
- Edward Lhuyd Fellow of Jesus College Oxford. Keeper of the Ashmolean Museum and the foremost Celtic scholar of his time. Born Oswestry, 1660.
- Ronald M Lockley Famous naturalist and author. Best known for his life on Skokholm Island off Pembrokeshire 1927-1940 and at Orielton in the 1950s to early 1960s. Born in Cardiff.
- Terry Matthews 'Mitel' and 'Newbridge' Networks founder.
- William Morgan Inventor of the vacuum tube, Coolidge tube, Britain's first actuary, founding father of modern actuarial science. The unknowing discoverer of x-rays, a hundred and ten years before Roentgen. Born in Bridgend, 1750, died 1833.
- William Henry Preece was an electrical engineer who was a major figure in the development and introduction of wireless telegraphy and the telephone in Great Britain. Born Feb 15 1834 in Bryn Helen.
- Richard Price Developer of the times tables for insurance scales. Born at Tynton Farm Llangeinor, South Wales
- William Price re-introduced cremation to Britain. Born Llantrisant, South Wales
- Pryce Pryce-Jones Gave mail-order (catalogue) shopping to the world. (circa 1859) Born/lived in Newtown, Montgomeryshire (Powys).
- Robert Recorde Very influential physician and mathematician. Robert published some of the most important books of his era including the first English language book on algebra which incidentally is where the equals symbol is first seen in use. From Tenby, West Wales.
- Isaac Roberts Pioneered deep space photography at the end of the 19th century. Born in Groes near Denbigh in 1829.
- Richard Roberts (engineer) Textile machinery, railway locomotives and other industrial inventions. Born Llanymynech, 1789.
- Bertrand Russell Philosopher, mathematician and the Nobel Prize for Literature in 1950. Russell is one of the most highly regarded academics of the 20th century. He popularized mathematics and proposed many ground breaking theories. Born in Trelleck, Monmouthshire, South Wales.
- David Thomas in 1837 invented a hot blast furnace process to make iron using anthracite coal in Ystradfera (Swansea Valley). transforming the iron-making process there and later in 1839 after re-locating to Pennsylvania where he became the "father" of the American steel industry with his invention.
- Sir Tudor Thomas Eye surgeon from Swansea. He pioneered ophthalmic corneaplasty in the 1930s. Born in Ystradgynlais 23 May 1893.
- Philip Vaughan Ironmaster who, in Carmarthen in 1794, patented the first design for a ball bearing.
- Alfred Russel Wallace Conferred with Darwin (and Darwin with him) regarding evolution of species and acknowledged as theory co-founder by Darwin in his 'On the Origin of Species'. Born Llanbadoc, near Usk, Monmouthshire.
- Evan Williams Physicist, discoverer of the meson sub-atomic particles. Born Cwmsychpant, Llandysul, Wales.
- Ernest Willows pioneering aviator. 'The Father of British Airships' Born in Cardiff, 1896.
- Winston M Thomas Celtic Engineering Inc. Texas telecommunications. (Inventor) vehicle fuel locking device. Born Llanelli

== Bibliography ==
- Davies, John; Jenkins, Nigel (2008). The Welsh Academy Encyclopaedia of Wales. Cardiff: University of Wales Press. ISBN 978-0-7083-1953-6.
