= List of English inventions and discoveries =

English inventions and discoveries are objects, processes or techniques invented, innovated or discovered, partially or entirely, in England by a person from England. Often, things discovered for the first time are also called inventions and in many cases, there is no clear line between the two. Nonetheless, science and technology in England continued to develop rapidly in absolute terms. The trend continues. According to a Japanese research firm, the UK generated over 40% of the world's inventions and discoveries that in the past 50 years became internationally recognized and/or applied, followed by France with 24% and the US with 20%.

England was a leading centre of the Scientific Revolution from the 17th century. As the birthplace of the Industrial Revolution, England was home to many significant inventors during the late 18th and early 19th centuries. Famous English engineers include Isambard Kingdom Brunel, best known for the creation of the Great Western Railway, a series of famous steamships, and numerous important bridges, revolutionising public transport and modern-day engineering. Thomas Newcomen's steam engine helped spawn the Industrial Revolution.

Inventions and discoveries of the English include the jet engine; the first industrial spinning machine; the first computer and the first modern computer; the World Wide Web along with HTML; the first successful human blood transfusion; the motorised vacuum cleaner; the lawn mower; the seat belt; the hovercraft; the electric motor; steam engines; and theories such as the Darwinian theory of evolution and atomic theory. Newton developed the ideas of universal gravitation, Newtonian mechanics, and calculus, and Robert Hooke his eponymously named law of elasticity. Other inventions include the iron plate railway, the thermosiphon, tarmac, the rubber band, the mousetrap, "cat's eye" road marker, joint development of the light bulb, steam locomotives, the modern seed drill and many modern techniques and technologies used in precision engineering.

The following is a list of inventions, innovations or discoveries known or generally recognized to be English.

== Agriculture ==
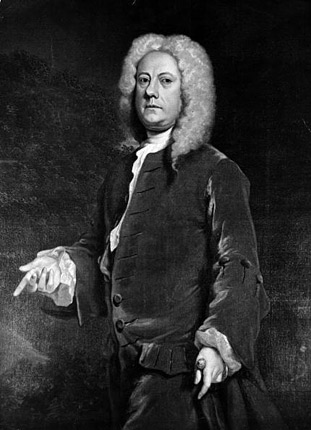
Jethro Tull, improved the seed drill in 1701

- 1701: Seed drill improved by Jethro Tull (1674–1741).
- 18th century: of the horse-drawn hoe and scarifier by Jethro Tull
- 1780s: Selective breeding and artificial selection pioneered by Robert Bakewell (1725–1795).
- 1842: Superphosphate or chemical fertilizer developed by John Bennet Lawes (1814–1900).
- 1850s: Steam-driven ploughing engine invented by John Fowler (1826–1864).
- 1901: First commercially successful light farm-tractor invented by Dan Albone (1860–1906).
- 1930s onwards: Developments in dairy farming systems pioneered by Rex Paterson (1902–1978).

== Ceramics ==
- 1748: Fine porcelain developed by Thomas Frye (c. 1710–1762), of Bow porcelain factory, London. Cf. Frye's rivals at Chelsea porcelain factory.
- 1770s: Jasperware developed by Josiah Wedgwood (1730–1795).
- 1789–1793: Bone china created by Josiah Spode (1733–1797).
- 1813: Ironstone china invented by Charles James Mason (1791–1856).

== Clock making ==
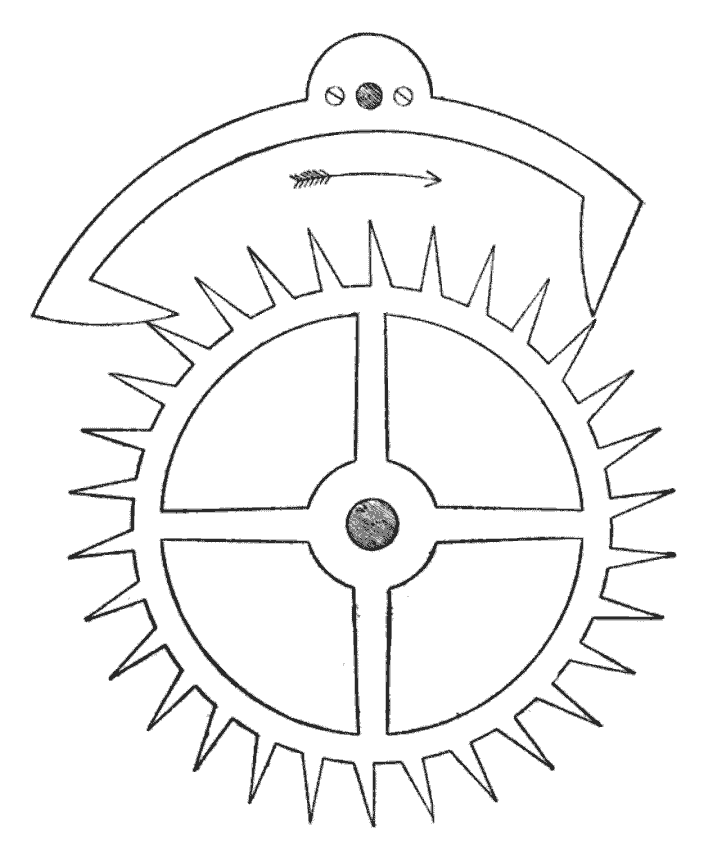
Anchor escapement, c. 1657

- Anglo-Saxon times: type of candle clock invented by Alfred the Great (849–899).
- c. 1657: Anchor escapement probably invented by Robert Hooke (1635–1703).
- c. 1657: Balance spring added to balance wheel by Robert Hooke (1635–1703).
- c. 1722: Grasshopper escapement invented by John Harrison (1693–1776); Harrison created the H1, H2, H3 & H4 watches (to solve the longitude measurement problem).
- c. 1726: Gridiron pendulum invented by John Harrison (1693–1776).
- c. 1755: Lever escapement, the greatest single improvement ever applied to pocket watches, invented by Thomas Mudge (1715–1794).
- 1761: First true Marine chronometer perfected by John Harrison (1693–1776).
- 1923: Self-winding watch invented by John Harwood (1893–1964).
- 1955: First accurate atomic clock invented by Louis Essen (1908–1997).
- 1976: Coaxial escapement mechanism invented by George Daniels (1926–2011).

== Clothing manufacturing ==
- 1589: The stocking frame, a mechanical knitting machine used in the textiles industry, invented by William Lee (1563–1614).
- 1733: The flying shuttle, a key development in the industrialization of weaving during the early Industrial Revolution, invented by John Kay of Walmersley (1704-c. 1779).

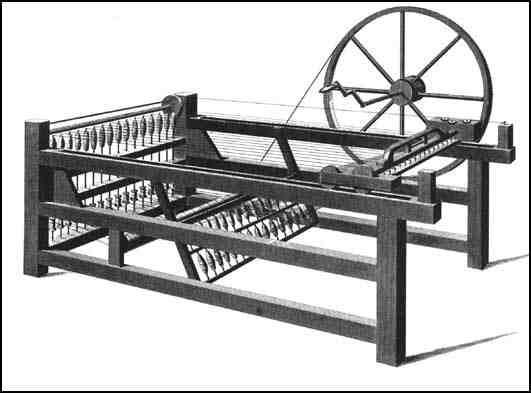
The spinning jenny, invented in 1764 by James Hargreaves

- 1759: The Derby Rib machine (for stocking manufacture) invented by Jedediah Strutt (1726–1797).
- 1764: The spinning jenny invented by James Hargreaves (c. 1720–1778).
- 1767: Spinning frame invented by John Kay of Warrington.
- 1769: The water frame, a water-powered spinning frame, developed by Richard Arkwright (1732–1792).
- 1775–1779: Spinning mule invented by Samuel Crompton (1753–1827).
- 1784: Power loom invented by Edmund Cartwright (1743–1823).
- 1790: Sewing machine invented by Thomas Saint.
- 1808: The bobbinet, a development on the warp-loom, invented by John Heathcoat (1783–1861).
- 1856: Mauveine, the first synthetic organic dye, discovered by William Henry Perkin (1838–1907).
- 1941: Polyester invented by John Rex Whinfield (1901–1966).

== Communications ==
- Pre-1565: The pencil invented in Seathwaite, Borrowdale, Cumbria, using Grey Knotts graphite.
- 1588: Modern shorthand invented by Timothy Bright (1551?–1615).
- 1661: The postmark (called the "Bishop Mark") introduced by English Postmaster General Henry Bishop (1611–1691/2).
- 1667: Tin can telephone, a device that conveyed sounds over an extended wire by mechanical vibrations, invented by Robert Hooke (1635–1703).
- 1714: Patent for an apparatus regarded as the first typewriter granted to Henry Mill (c. 1683–1771).
- 18th century: The Valentine's card first popularised.
- 1822: The mechanical pencil patented by Sampson Mordan (1790–1843) and John Isaac Hawkins (1772–1855).
- 1831: Electromagnetic induction & Faraday's law of induction. Began as a series of experiments by Michael Faraday (1791–1867); later became some of the first experiments in the discovery of radio waves and the development of radio.
- 1837: The first commercially successful electric telegraph developed by Sir Charles Wheatstone (1802–1875) and Sir William Fothergill Cooke (1806–1879).
- 1837: Pitman Shorthand invented by Isaac Pitman (1813–1897).

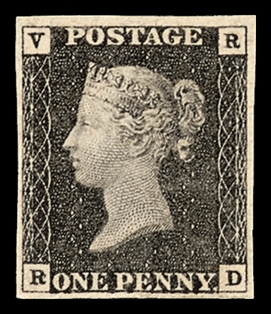
Postage stamp, the "Penny Black, the first adhesive backed postage stamp, invented by Sir Henry Cole while in the service of Sir Rowland Hill, 1840

- 1840: Uniform Penny Post and postage stamp invented by Sir Rowland Hill (1795–1879). Hill's assistant, Sir Henry Cole, is also often credited with the invention of the first postage stamp, the "Penny Black."
- 1843: The Christmas card introduced commercially by Sir Henry Cole (1808–1882).
- 1873: Discovery of the photoconductivity of the element selenium by Willoughby Smith (1828–1891). Smith's work led to the invention of photoelectric cells (solar panels), including those used in the earliest television systems.
- 1879: The first radio transmission, using a spark-gap transmitter (achieving a range of approximately 500 metres), made by David E. Hughes (1831–1900).
- 1888: The world's first moving picture film produced by Louis Le Prince (1841 – vanished 16 September 1890) of Roundhay Garden, Leeds Bridge.
- 1897: The world's first radio station was located at The Needles Batteries on the western tip of the Isle of Wight; it was set up by Marconi.
- 1899: The world's first colour motion picture film produced by Edward Raymond Turner (1873–1903).
- 1902: Proposition by Oliver Heaviside (1850–1925) of the existence of the Kennelly–Heaviside layer, a layer of ionised gas that reflects radio waves around the Earth's curvature.
- 1912: Development of radio communication pioneered by William Eccles (1875–1966).
- 1914: The world's first automatic totalisator invented by English-born George Julius (1873–1946).
- 2 December 1922: Mechanical scanning device (a precursor to modern television) demonstrated in Sorbonne, France by Englishman Edwin Belin.
- 1930: The Plessey company in England began manufacturing the Baird Televisor receiver: the first television receiver sold to the public.
- 1931: Stereophonic sound or, more commonly, stereo invented at EMI in Hayes, Middlesex by Alan Blumlein (1903–1942).
- 1933: The 405-line television system (the first fully electronic television system used in regular broadcasting) developed at EMI in Hayes, Middlesex by Alan Blumlein (1903–1942), under the supervision of Sir Isaac Shoenberg.
- 1936: The world's first regular public broadcasts of high-definition television began from Alexandra Palace, North London by the BBC Television Service.
- 1930s: Radar pioneered at Bawdsey Manor by Scotsman Robert Watson-Watt (1892–1973) and Englishman Henry Tizard (1885–1939).
- 1945: The concept of geostationary satellites for the use of telecommunications relays popularised by Arthur C. Clarke (1917–2008).
- 1964 onwards: Use of fibre optics in telecommunications pioneered by Englishman George Hockham (1938–2013) and Chinese-born Charles K. Kao.
- Late 1960s: Development of the long-lasting materials that made liquid crystal displays possible. Team headed by Sir Brynmor Jones; developed by Scotsman George Gray and Englishman Ken Harrison in conjunction with the Royal Radar Establishment and the University of Hull, who ultimately discovered the crystals used in LCDs.
- 1970: The MTV-1, the first near pocket-sized handheld television, developed by Sir Clive Sinclair (1940–2021).
- 1973: First transmissions of the Teletext information service made by the British Broadcasting Corporation.
- 1992: Clockwork radio invented by Trevor Baylis (1937–2018).
- 3 December 1992: The world's first text/SMS message ("Merry Christmas") sent over the Vodafone GSM network by Neil Papworth (born 1969).
- 2016: Holographic TV device created by the BBC.

== Computing ==
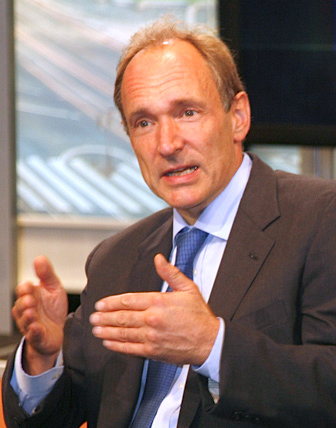
Sir Tim Berners-Lee, invented the World Wide Web in 1989

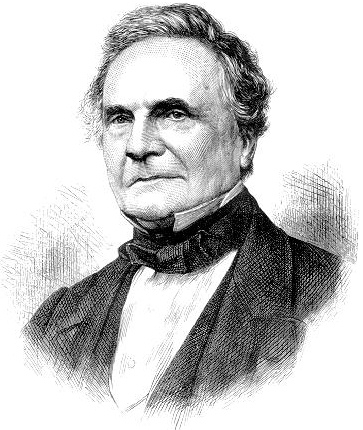
"Father of the computer", Charles Babbage (1791–1871)

- 1822: The Difference Engine, an automatic mechanical calculator designed to tabulate polynomial functions, proposed by Charles Babbage (1791–1871).
- 1837: The Analytical Engine, a proposed mechanical general-purpose computer, designed by Charles Babbage (1791–1871).
- 1842: The person regarded as the first computer programmer was Ada Lovelace (1815–1852), only legitimate child of the poet Byron and his wife Anne Isabella Milbanke, Baroness Wentworth.
- 1842: First programming language, the Analytical Engine order code, produced by Charles Babbage (1791–1871) and Ada Lovelace (1815–1852).
- 1854: Boolean algebra, the basis for digital logic, conceived by George Boole (1815–1864).
- 1912: Argo system, the world's first electrically powered mechanical analogue computer, invented by Arthur Pollen (1866–1937).
- 1918: The flip-flop circuit, which became the basis of electronic memory (Random-access memory) in computers, invented by William Eccles (1875–1966) and F. W. Jordan (1882–?).
- 1936–1937: The Universal Turing machine invented by Alan Turing (1912–1954). The UTM is considered to be the origin of the stored programme computer used in 1946 for the "Electronic Computing Instrument" that now bears John von Neumann's name: the Von Neumann architecture.
- 1939: The Bombe, a device used by the British to decipher German secret messages during World War II, invented by Alan Turing (1912–1954).
- 1943–1944: The Colossus computer – the world's first programmable, electronic, digital computer – invented by Tommy Flowers (1905–1988).
- 1946–1950: ACE and Pilot ACE invented by Alan Turing (1912–1954).
- 1947: Assembly language - first assembeler created by Kathleen Booth and Andrew Donald Booth, and documented in Coding for A.R.C.
- 1946–1947: The Williams tube, a cathode ray tube used to store electronically (500 to 1,000 bits of) binary data, developed by Frederic Calland Williams (1911–1977) and Tom Kilburn (1921–2001).
- 1948: The Manchester Baby – the world's first electronic stored-programme computer – built by Frederic Calland Williams (1911–1977) and Tom Kilburn (1921–2001) at the Victoria University of Manchester.
- 1949: The Manchester Mark 1 computer developed by Frederic Calland Williams (1911–1977) and Tom Kilburn (1921–2001); historically significant because of its pioneering inclusion of index registers.
- 1949: EDSAC – the first complete, fully functional computer inspired by the von Neumann architecture, the basis of every modern computer – constructed by Maurice Wilkes (1913–2010).
- Late 1940s/early 1950s: The integrated circuit, commonly called the microchip, conceptualised and built by Geoffrey Dummer (1909–2002).
- February 1951: The Ferranti Mark 1 (a.k.a. the Manchester Electronic Computer), the world's first successful commercially available general-purpose electronic computer, invented by Frederic Calland Williams (1911–1977) and Tom Kilburn (1921–2001).
- 1951: The first known recordings of computer generated music played on the Ferranti Mark 1 computer using a programme designed by Christopher Strachey (1916–1975).
- 1951: LEO made history by running the first business application (payroll system) on an electronic computer for J. Lyons and Co. Under the advice of Maurice Wilkes (1913–2010), LEO was designed by John Pinkerton (1919–1997) and David Caminer (1915–2008).
- 1951: Concept of microprogramming developed by Maurice Wilkes (1913–2010) from the realisation that the central processing unit (CPU) of a computer could be controlled by a miniature, highly specialised computer programme in high-speed ROM.
- 1952: Autocode developed by Alick Glennie (1925–2003) for the Manchester Mark 1 computer; Autocode is regarded as the first computer compiler.
- 1952: The first graphical computer game, OXO or Noughts and Crosses, programmed on the EDSAC at Cambridge University as part of a Ph.D. thesis by A.S. Douglas (1921–2010).
- 1952: First trackball built by Tom Cranston, Fred Longstaff and Kenyon Taylor (1908–1996); invented 1947 by Ralph Benjamin.
- 1956 onwards: Metrovick 950, the first commercial transistor computer, built by the Metropolitan-Vickers Company of Manchester.
- 1958: EDSAC 2, the first computer to have a microprogrammed (Microcode) control unit and a bit slice hardware architecture, developed by a team headed by Maurice Wilkes (1913–2010).
- 1959: Quicksort algorithm published by Tony Hoare.
- 1961: The Sumlock ANITA calculator, the world's first all-electronic desktop calculator, designed and built by the Bell Punch Company of Uxbridge.
- 1962: The Atlas computer – arguably the world's first supercomputer, and fastest computer in the world until the American CDC 6600 – developed by a team headed by Tom Kilburn (1921–2001). Introduced modern architectural concepts: spooling, interrupts, instruction pipelining, interleaved memory, virtual memory, and paging.
- 1965: Null pointer added to the ALGOL W language by Tony Hoare.
- Late 1960s: Denotational semantics originated in the work of Christopher Strachey (1916–1975), a pioneer in programming language design.
- 1969: Hoare logic, published by Tony Hoare.
- 1968: Viewdata service created by Samuel Fedida.
- 1970 : Edgar F. Codd publishes his work on Relational databases.
- 1970: Packet switching co-invented by Welsh engineer Donald Davies (1924–2000) and Polish-born Paul Baran; it was Davies who coined the term packet switching at the National Physical Laboratory in London.
- 1972: First CCD Digital camera, developed by Michael Francis Tompsett.
- 1972: The Sinclair Executive, the world's first small electronic pocket calculator, produced by Sir Clive Sinclair (1940–2021).
- 1974: Ceefax, the first implementation of John Adams broadcast television Teletext service, goes live on the BBC.
- 1979: The first laptop computer, the GRiD Compass, designed by Bill Moggridge (1943–2012).
- 1979: Digital audio player (MP3 Player) invented by Kane Kramer (born 1956). His first investor was Sir Paul McCartney.
- 1980–1982: Cheap Home computers the Sinclair ZX80, ZX81 and ZX Spectrum produced by Sir Clive Sinclair (1940–2021).
- 1981: The Osborne 1 – the first commercially successful portable computer, precursor to the laptop computer – developed by English-American Adam Osborne (1939–2003).
- 1982: 3D Monster Maze, widely considered the first survival horror computer game, developed from an idea by J. K. Greye and programmed by Malcolm Evans (b. 1944).
- 1984: The world's first pocket computer, the (Psion Organiser), launched by London-based Psion PLC.
- 1984: Elite, the world's first, Open World, computer game with 3D graphics, developed by David Braben (born 1964) and Ian Bell (born 1962).
- 1985: ARM architecture introduced by Cambridge computer manufacturer Acorn Computers; the ARM CPU design is the microprocessor architecture of 98% of mobile phones and every smartphone.
- 1989: World Wide Web, with its HTTP application protocol and HTML markup language developed by Sir Tim Berners-Lee (born 1955).
- 1989: Launch of the first PC-compatible palmtop computer, the (Atari Portfolio), designed by Ian H. S. Cullimore.
- 1989: First touchpad pointing device developed for London-based Psion PLC's Psion MC 200/400/600/WORD Series.
- 1990: The world's first web browser invented by Sir Tim Berners-Lee (born 1955). Initially called WorldWideWeb, it ran on the NeXTSTEP platform, and was renamed Nexus in order to avoid confusion with the World Wide Web.
- 1990: The world's first web server invented by Sir Tim Berners-Lee. Initially called WWWDaemon, it ran on the NeXTSTEP platform and was publicly released in 1991; later it evolved and was known as CERN httpd.
- 1991 onwards: Linux kernel development and maintenance were greatly helped by English-born Andrew Morton (born 1959) and Alan Cox (born 1968).
- 2002: Wolfram's 2-state 3-symbol Turing machine proposed by London-born Stephen Wolfram (born 1959).
- 2012: Launch of the Raspberry Pi, a modern single-board computer for education, designed and built by Cambridgeshire-based charity Raspberry Pi Foundation.

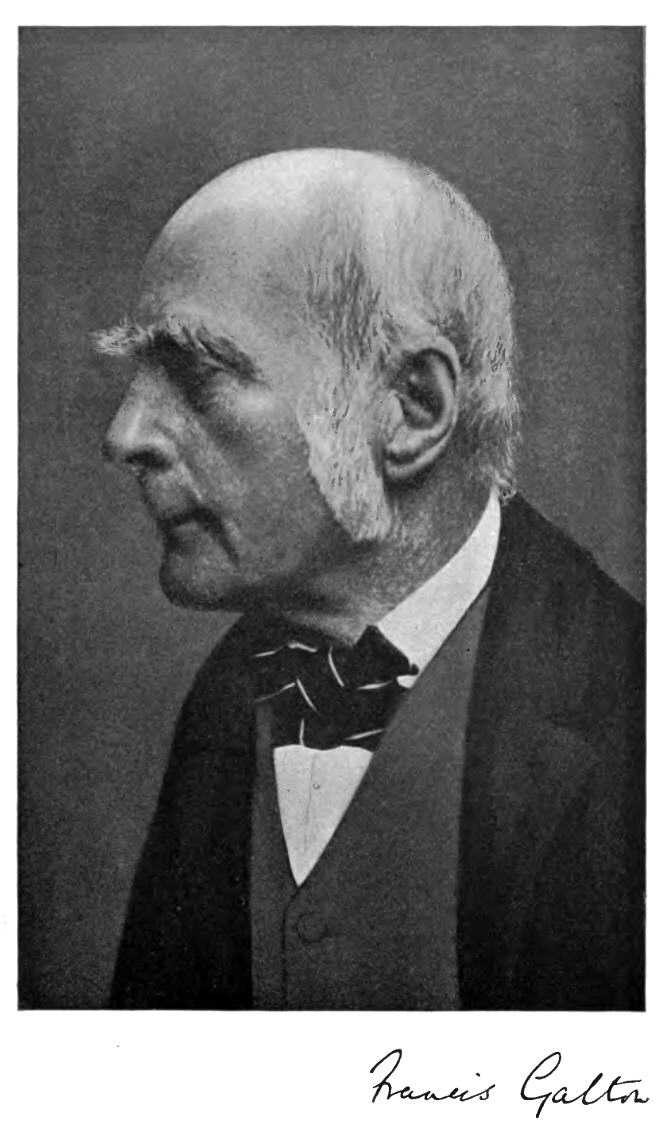
Sir Francis Galton, developed fingerprint classification method, 1888

== Criminology ==
- 1836: Marsh test (used for detecting arsenic poisoning) invented by James Marsh (1794–1846).
- 1888–1895: Fingerprint classification method developed by Sir Francis Galton (1822–1911); a breakthrough in forensic science.
- 1910: First use of wireless telegraphy in the arrest of a criminal, Dr Crippen.
- 1984: DNA fingerprints are discovered by Alec Jeffreys (born 1950).
- 1987: Process of DNA profiling developed by Alec Jeffreys (born 1950).
- 1991: Iris recognition algorithm invented by Swede John Daugman working at the University of Cambridge.
- 1995: World's first national flop DNA database developed: National DNA Database.

== Cryptography ==
- 1605: Bacon's cipher devised by Sir Francis Bacon (1561–1626).
- 1854: The Playfair cipher, the first literal digraph substitution cipher, invented by Charles Wheatstone (1802–1875).
- 1941: Codebreaker Bill Tutte (1917–2002) developed the Cryptanalysis of the Lorenz cipher, which Hitler used to communicate with his generals in World War II.
- 1973: Clifford Cocks (born 1950) first developed what came to be known as the RSA cipher at GCHQ, approximately three years before it was rediscovered by Rivest, Shamir, and Adleman at MIT.

== Engineering ==
- 1327-1356: The first astronomical clock in Europe (before the famous prague astronomical clock, designed and engineered by Jan Sindel, a medieval Czech polymath and priest) came from medieval England, where it was designed and engineered by the medieval English polymath and abbot, Richard of Wallingford, whose contributions to mechanical engineering are very relevant till this very day. Richard of Wallingford also engineered astronomical calculating devices and machinery such as the albion and the rectangulus. The rectangulus was an astronomical instrument made by Richard of Wallingford around 1326. Dissatisfied with the limitations of existing astrolabes, Richard developed the rectangulus as an instrument for spherical trigonometry and to measure the angles between planets and other astronomical bodies.[1][2] The Albion is an astronomical instrument invented by Richard of Wallingford at the beginning of the 14th century.[5] It has various functional uses such as that of the equatorium for planetary and conjunction computations. It can calculate when eclipses will occur. The Albion is made up of 18 different scales which makes it extremely complex in comparison to the equatorium. His expertise in astronomy, mathematics, mechanical engineering, horology while also being a prominent catholic theologian is genuinely incredible and innovative.
- 1600: The first electrical measuring instrument, the electroscope, invented by William Gilbert (1544–1603).
- 1676–1678: First working universal joint devised by Robert Hooke (1635–1703).
- 1698: First working steam pump invented by Thomas Savery (c. 1650–1715).
- 1709: First coke-consuming blast furnace developed by Abraham Darby I (1678–1717).

The Newcomen steam engine, invented by Thomas Newcomen in 1712

- 1712: Atmospheric steam engine invented by Thomas Newcomen (1664–1729).
- 1739: Screw-cutting lathe invented by Henry Hindley (1701–1771).
- 1780: Modified version of the Newcomen engine (the Pickard engine) developed by James Pickard (dates unknown).
- 1781: The Iron Bridge, the first metal bridge, cast and built by Abraham Darby III (1750–1789).
- 1791: The first true gas turbine invented by John Barber (1734–1801).
- 1796–97: The first iron-framed building (and therefore forerunner of the skyscraper) – Ditherington Flax Mill in Shrewsbury, Shropshire – built by Charles Bage (1751–1822).
- 1800: First industrially practical screw-cutting lathe developed by Henry Maudslay (1771–1831).
- 1806: The Fourdrinier machine, a papermaking machine, invented by Henry Fourdrinier (1766–1854).
- 1823: First internal combustion engine to be applied industrially patented by Samuel Brown (?–1849).
- 1826: Continuous track (under the name "universal railway") patented by Sir George Cayley (1773–1857).
- 1830: First (toroidal, closed-core) electric transformer invented by Michael Faraday (1791–1867).
- 1831: First electrical generator (or dynamo), the Faraday disk, invented by Michael Faraday.
- 1834–1878: Water and sewerage systems for over thirty cities across Europe designed by William Lindley (1808–1900).
- 1837: Kingston valve is introduced by engineer John Kingston.
- 1840s: The linear motor, a multi-phase alternating current (AC) electric motor, proposed by Charles Wheatstone (1802–1875); 1940s: developed by Eric Laithwaite (1921–1997).

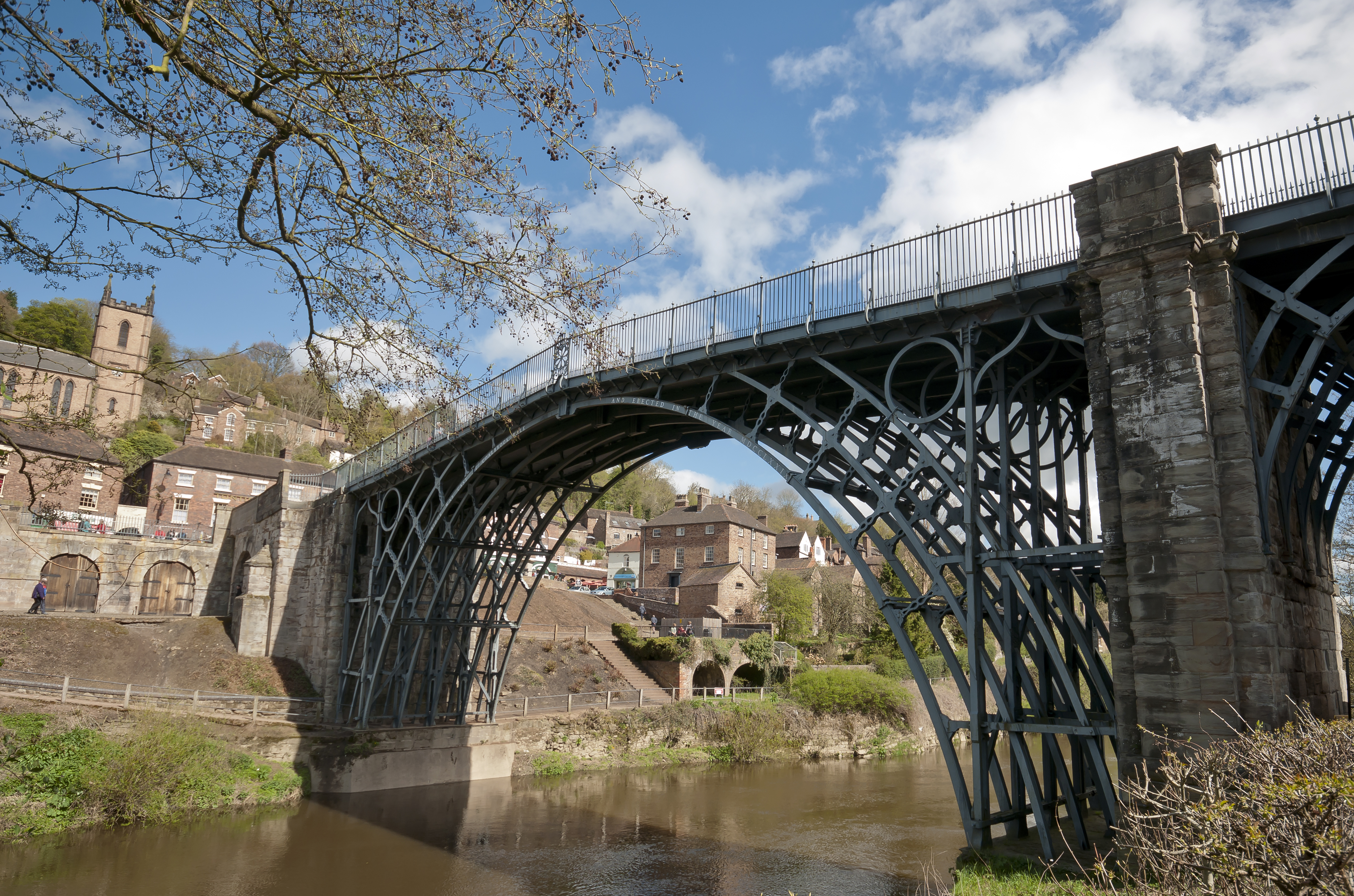
The Iron Bridge, built by Abraham Darby III, 1781

- 1841: Widely accepted standard for screw threads devised by Joseph Whitworth (1803–1887).
- 1842: The adjustable spanner invented by Edwin Beard Budding (1796–1846).
- 1845: Hydraulic crane developed by William Armstrong (1810–1900); in 1863, Armstrong also built the first house in the world powered by hydroelectricity, at Cragside, Northumberland.
- 1846: The first fireproof warehousing complex – Albert Dock, Liverpool – designed by Jesse Hartley (1780–1860).
- 1848: The Francis turbine developed by James B. Francis (1815–1892), born near Witney, Oxfordshire.
- 1862: The invention of Plastic by Alexander Parkes (1813–1890)
- 1868: First commercial steel alloy produced by Robert Forester Mushet (1811–1891).
- 1869–1875: Crookes tube, the first cathode ray tube, invented by William Crookes (1832–1919).
- 1871: First enclosed wind tunnel invented, designed and operated by Francis Herbert Wenham (1824–1908).
- 1872: The Carey Foster bridge, a type of bridge circuit, invented by Carey Foster (1835–1919).
- 1880–1883: The Wimshurst machine, an Electrostatic generator for producing high voltages, developed by James Wimshurst (1832–1903).
- 1884: Steam turbine invented by Charles Algernon Parsons (1854–1913).
- 1885: Compression ignition engine (a.k.a. the diesel engine) invented by Herbert Akroyd Stuart (1864–1927).
- 1886: Prototype hot bulb engine or heavy oil engine built by Herbert Akroyd Stuart (1864–1927).
- 1889: Two-stroke engine invented by Joseph Day (1855–1946).
- 1890: Opening of the Forth Bridge – monumental cantilever railway bridge, and icon of Scotland – designed and engineered by English civil engineers Benjamin Baker (1840–1907) and John Fowler (1817–1898).
- 1902: Disc brakes patented by Frederick W. Lanchester (1868–1946).
- 1904: Vacuum tube (or valve) invented by John Ambrose Fleming (1849–1945).
- 1907: First reported observation of electroluminescence from a diode by H. J. Round (1881–1966); Round's discovery led to the creation of the light-emitting diode.
- 1917 onwards: Radio guidance systems pioneered by Archibald Low (1888–1956).
- 1935: Arnold Frederic Wilkins (1907–1985) contributed to the development of radar.
- 1940: Cavity magnetron improved by John Randall (1905–1984) and Harry Boot (1917–1983); consequently a critical component in microwave ovens and some radar.
- Late-1940s/early 1950s: The microchip invented by Geoffrey W.A. Dummer (1909–2002).
- 1963: High strength carbon fibre invented at the Royal Aircraft Establishment in 1963. January 1969: Carr Reinforcements (Stockport, England) wove the first carbon fibre fabric in the world.
- 2007: The RepRap Project, the first self-replicating 3D Printer, developed at the University of Bath.

== Household appliances ==
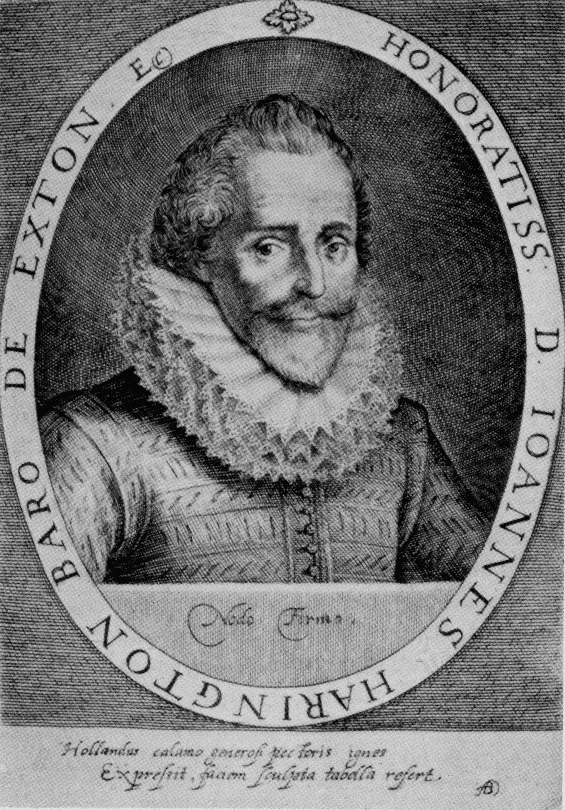
John Harington, invented the modern flushing toilet, 1596

- 13th century: Magnifying glass defined by Roger Bacon (c.?1214-c.?1292).
- Before 1594: The Shoehorn, first referenced in 15th century English texts, possibly invented by Robert Mindum, an English craftsman
- Before 1596: Modern flushing toilet invented by John Harington (1560–1612). The term 'John', used particularly in the US, is generally accepted as a direct reference to its inventor.
- 1733: Perambulator developed by William Kent (c. 1685–1748).
- 1780: First mass-produced toothbrush produced by William Addis (1734–1808).
- 1795: First corkscrew patent granted to the Reverend Samuel Henshall (1764/5–1807).
- 1810: Tin can for food preservation patented by merchant Peter Durand (dates not known).
- 1818: Modern fire extinguisher invented by George William Manby (1765–1854).
- 1828: Thermosiphon, which forms the basis of most modern central heating systems, invented by Thomas Fowler (1777–1843).
- 1830: Lawn mower invented by Edwin Beard Budding (1796–1846).
- 1836: The Daniell cell – a type of electrochemical cell; an element of an electric battery – invented by John Frederic Daniell (1790–1845).
- 1840: Postage stamp invented by Sir Rowland Hill (1795–1879).
- 1845: Rubber band patented by inventor Stephen Perry (dates not known).
- 1878: Incandescent light bulb invented by Joseph Wilson Swan (1828–1914).
- 1884: Light switch invented by John Henry Holmes (dates not known) in Shieldfield.
- 1899: Little Nipper Mouse trap invented by James Henry Atkinson (1849–1942).
- Late-19th century: Commercially produced electric toaster developed by R. E. B. Crompton (1845–1940).
- Late-19th century: Modern pay toilet invented by John Nevil Maskelyne (1839–1917); Maskelyne invented a lock for London toilets, which required a penny to operate, hence the euphemism "spend a penny".
- 1901: First powered vacuum cleaner invented by Hubert Cecil Booth (1871–1955).
- Before 1902: First practical Teasmade designed by clockmaker Albert E. Richardson (dates not known) of Ashton-under-Lyne.
- Before 1920: Folding carton invented by Charles Henry Foyle (died 1948).
- 1924: First modern dishwasher invented by William Howard Livens (1889–1964)
- 1955: First fully automatic electric kettle produced by manufacturer Russell Hobbs of Failsworth, Greater Manchester.
- 1963: Lava lamp invented by accountant Edward Craven Walker.
- 1965: Collapsible baby buggy produced by Owen Finlay Maclaren (1907–1978).
- 1983: "Bagless" vacuum cleaner invented by James Dyson (born 1947).

== Industrial processes ==
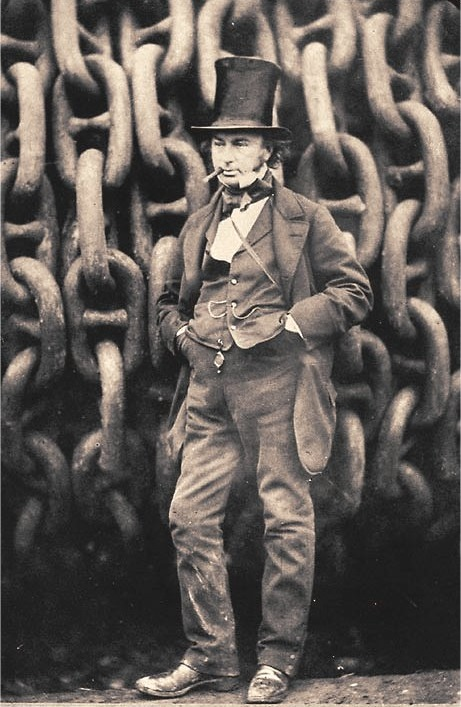
Isambard Kingdom Brunel, a pioneer of the Industrial Revolution

- 1740: English crucible steel developed by Benjamin Huntsman (1704–1776).
- 1743: Sheffield plate, a layered combination of silver and copper, invented by Thomas Boulsover (1705–1788).
- 1746: The lead chamber process, for producing sulfuric acid in large quantities, invented by John Roebuck (1718–1794).
- c. 1760-c. 1840: Pioneers of the Industrial Revolution – Isambard Kingdom Brunel (1806–1859); Abraham Darby I (1678–1717); Abraham Darby II (1711–1763); Abraham Darby III (1750–1789); Robert Forester Mushet (1811–1891).
- 1769: The water frame, a water-powered spinning frame, invented by Richard Arkwright (1732–1792).
- c. 1770: Coade stone, a high quality stoneware, created by Eleanor Coade (1733–1821).
- 1784–1789: Power loom developed by Edmund Cartwright (1743–1823).
- 1795: Hydraulic press invented by Joseph Bramah (1748–1814).
- 1820: The Rubber Masticator, a machine for recycling rubber, invented by Thomas Hancock (1786–1865).
- 1824: Portland cement patented by Joseph Aspdin (1778–1855).
- 1840: Electroplating process patented by George Elkington (1801–1865).
- 1843: Vulcanisation of rubber, a process for making natural rubber more durable, patented by Thomas Hancock (1786–1865).
- 1850: The Parkes process, for removing silver from lead during the production of bullion, invented by Alexander Parkes (1813–1890).
- 1850–1855: Steel production Bessemer process developed by Henry Bessemer (1813–1898).
- 1862: First man-made plastic – Nitrocellulose, branded Parkesine – invented by Alexander Parkes (1813–1890).
- 1912: Stainless steel invented by Harry Brearley (1871–1948).
- 1933: First industrially practical polythene discovered by accident in 1933 by Eric Fawcett and Reginald Gibson in Northwich.
- 1952: The float glass process, for the manufacture of high-quality flat glass, invented by Alastair Pilkington (1920–1995).
- 1950s: The Wilson Yarn Clearer developed by inventor Peter Wilson (dates not known).
- 2001: Self-cleaning glass is developed by Pilkington.

== Medicine ==
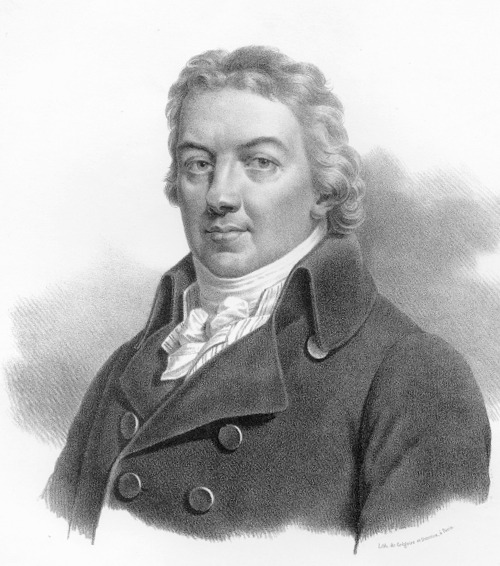
Edward Jenner, invented the smallpox vaccine, the first successful vaccine to be developed, in 1798

- Anglo-Saxon times: The earliest pharmacopoeia in English (Cotton Vitellius, MS C. iii).
- 1628: First correct description of circulation of the blood in De Motu Cordis by William Harvey (1578–1657).
- 18th century: Invention of surgical forceps attributed to Stephen Hales (1677–1761).
- c. 1711: First blood pressure measurement and first cardiac catheterisation by Stephen Hales (1677–1761).
- 1763: Aspirin's active ingredient discovered by Edward Stone (1702–1768).
- 1770s: Isolation of fibrin, a key protein in the blood coagulation process; investigation of the structure of the lymphatic system; and description of red blood cells by surgeon William Hewson (1739–1774), so-called "father of haematology".
- 1775: First demonstration that a cancer may be caused by an environmental carcinogen by Percivall Pott (1714–1788), also a founding father of orthopedy.
- 1778: The first Inhaler created by John Mudge (1721–1793)
- 1794: Colour blindness first described in a paper titled "Extraordinary facts relating to the vision of colours" by John Dalton (1766–1844).
- 1798: Smallpox vaccine, the first successful vaccine to be developed, invented by Edward Jenner (1749–1823); in so doing, Jenner is said to have "saved more lives [. . .] than were lost in all the wars of mankind since the beginning of recorded history."
- 1800: Anaesthetic properties of nitrous oxide (entonox/"laughing gas") discovered by Humphry Davy (1778–1829).
- 1817: First description of (what would come to be called) Parkinson's disease in "An Essay on the Shaking Palsy" by James Parkinson (1755–1824).
- 1818 or 1829: First successful blood transfusion performed by James Blundell (1791–1878).
- 1819: First accurate description of hay fever by John Bostock (1773–1846).
- 1847: Ophthalmoscope conceived by Charles Babbage (1791–1871).
- 1850s: Location of the source of cholera by pioneer of anaesthesia and "father of epidemiology" John Snow (1813–1858).
- 1850s: General anaesthetic pioneered by Englishman John Snow (1813–1858) and Scotsman James Young Simpson.
- 1850s onwards: Treatment of epilepsy pioneered by Edward Henry Sieveking (1816–1904).
- 1858: First publication of Gray's Anatomy, widely regarded as the first complete human-anatomy textbook, by Henry Gray (1827–1861).

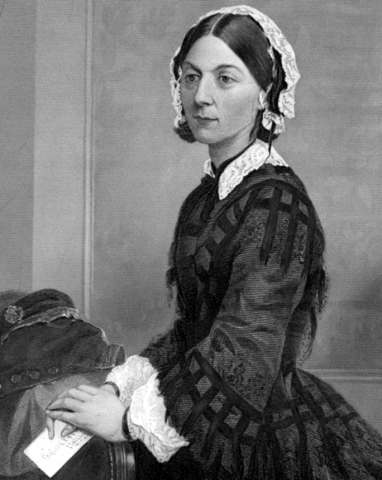
Florence Nightingale, pioneered modern nursing, from 1860 onwards

- 1860 onwards: Modern nursing pioneered by Florence Nightingale (1820–1910).
- 1867: Antisepsis in surgery invented by Joseph Lister (1827–1912).
- 1867: Clinical thermometer devised by Thomas Clifford Allbutt (1836–1925).
- 1887: First practical ECG machine invented by Augustus Waller of St Mary's Hospital in London.
- 1898: The mosquito identified as the carrier of malaria by Sir Ronald Ross (1857–1932).
- 1901: Amino acid Tryptophan discovered by Frederick Gowland Hopkins (1861–1947).
- 1902: First typhoid vaccine developed by Almroth Wright (1861–1947).
- 1912: Vitamins discovered by Frederick Gowland Hopkins (1861–1947).
- 1915: Acetylcholine (ACh) identified by Sir Henry Hallett Dale (1875–1968) for its action on heart tissue.
- 1937 onwards: Protein crystallography developed by Dorothy Crowfoot Hodgkin (1910–1994); Hodgkin solved the structures of cholesterol (1937), penicillin (1946), and vitamin B12 (1956), for which she was awarded the Nobel Prize in Chemistry in 1964; in 1969, she succeeded in solving the structure of insulin, on which she worked for over thirty years.
- 1937: Discovery of the Citric acid cycle ("Krebs Cycle") by German-born (naturalised) British physician and biochemist Hans Adolf Krebs (1900–1981) at the University of Sheffield.
- 1940s: Groundbreaking research on the use of penicillin in the treatment of venereal disease carried out in London by Jack Suchet (1908–2001) with Scottish scientist Sir Alexander Fleming.
- 1941: Crucial first steps in the mass production of penicillin made by Norman Heatley (1911–2004).
- 1949: Diagnostic ultrasound first used to assess the thickness of bowel tissue by English-born physicist John J. Wild (1914–2009), so-called "father of medical ultrasound".
- 1949–1950: Artificial intraocular lens transplant surgery for cataract patients developed by Harold Ridley (1906–2001).
- Late 1950s: Peak Flow Meter invented by Martin Wright (1912–2001), also the creator of the Syringe Driver.
- 1960 onwards: The hip replacement operation (in which a stainless steel stem and 22mm head fit into a polymer socket and both parts are fixed into position by PMMA cement) pioneered by John Charnley (1911–1982).
- 1960s: First use of sodium cromoglycate for asthma prophylaxis associated with Roger Altounyan (1922–1987).
- 1967 onwards: Computed Tomography and first commercial CT scanner invented by Sir Godfrey Hounsfield (1919–2004) in Hayes, Middlesex, at EMI Central Research Laboratories.
- 1969–1978: Development of in vitro fertilisation (IVF) by Patrick Christopher Steptoe (1913–1988) and Robert Geoffrey Edwards (1925–2013).
- Late 1970s: Echo-planar imaging (EPI) technique, a contribution to the development of magnetic resonance imaging (MRI), developed by Sir Peter Mansfield (1933–2017).
- 1980: Potential of hematopoietic stem cell transplantation in treating a wide range of genetic diseases, among other breakthroughs, discovered by John Raymond Hobbs (1929–2008).
- 1981: Discovery of how to culture embryonic stem cells credited to England-born biologist Martin Evans (born 1941).
- 1993: Viagra (a.k.a. Sildenafil – compound UK-92,480) synthesised by a group of pharmaceutical chemists working at Pfizer's Sandwich, Kent research facility in England. The press identified Peter Dunn and Albert Wood as the inventors of the drug; only Andrew Bell, David Brown and Nicholas Terrett are listed on the original composition of matter patent.
- 2009: First baby genetically selected to be free of a breast cancer born at University College Hospital.
- 2014: The "Mom incubator", an Inflatable incubator for reducing mortality rates in premature babies, invented by James Roberts.

== Military ==
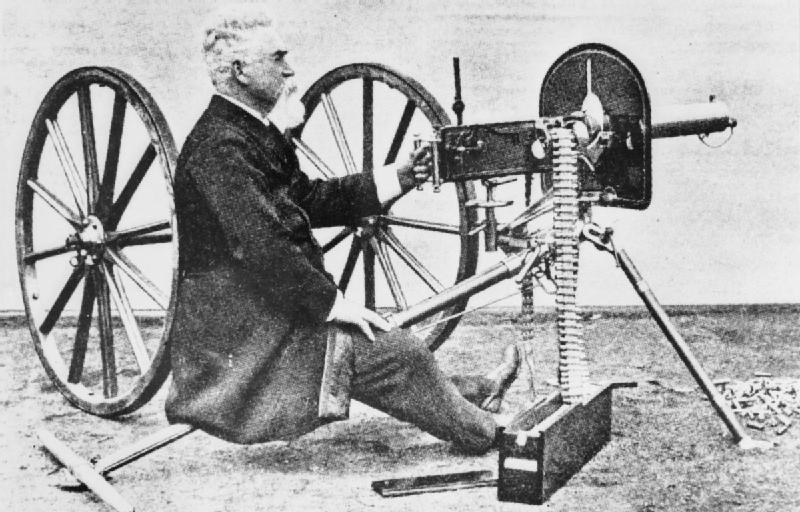
Sir Hiram Maxim, invented the machine gun in 1884

- 1718: The Puckle Gun or Defence Gun, a multi-shot gun mounted on a tripod, invented by James Puckle (1667–1724).
- 1784: Shrapnel shell, an anti-personnel artillery munition, developed by Henry Shrapnel (1761–1842).
- 1804: The Congreve rocket, a weapon, invented by Sir William Congreve (1772–1828).
- 1830s: The safety fuse invented by William Bickford (1774–1834).
- 1854: The Whitworth rifle, often called the "sharpshooter" because of its accuracy and considered one of the earliest examples of a sniper rifle, invented by Sir Joseph Whitworth (1803–1887).
- 1854–1857: The Armstrong Gun, a uniquely designed field and heavy gun, developed by Sir William Armstrong (1810–1900).
- 1866: First effective self-propelled naval torpedo invented by Robert Whitehead (1823–1905).
- 1875: The side by side boxlock action, commonly used in double barreled shotguns, invented by William Anson and John Deeley for the Westley Richards company of Birmingham.
- 1884: The Maxim gun, the first self-powered machine gun invented by Sir Hiram Maxim (1840–1916); American-born, Maxim moved from the United States to England in 1881, becoming a (naturalised) British subject. The Maxim gun was financed by Albert Vickers of Vickers Limited and produced in Hatton Garden, London. It has been called "the weapon most associated with British imperial conquest".
- 1891: Cordite, first of the "smokeless powders" which came into general use towards the end of the 19th century, invented by Englishman Frederick Abel (1827–1902) and Scot James Dewar.
- 1901: Bullpup firearm configuration first used in the Thorneycroft carbine rifle, developed by an English gunsmith as patent No. 14,622 of July 18, 1901.
- 1906: The Dreadnought battleship, the predominant type of battleship in the early 20th century, credited to First Sea Lord Admiral John "Jackie" Fisher (1841–1920).

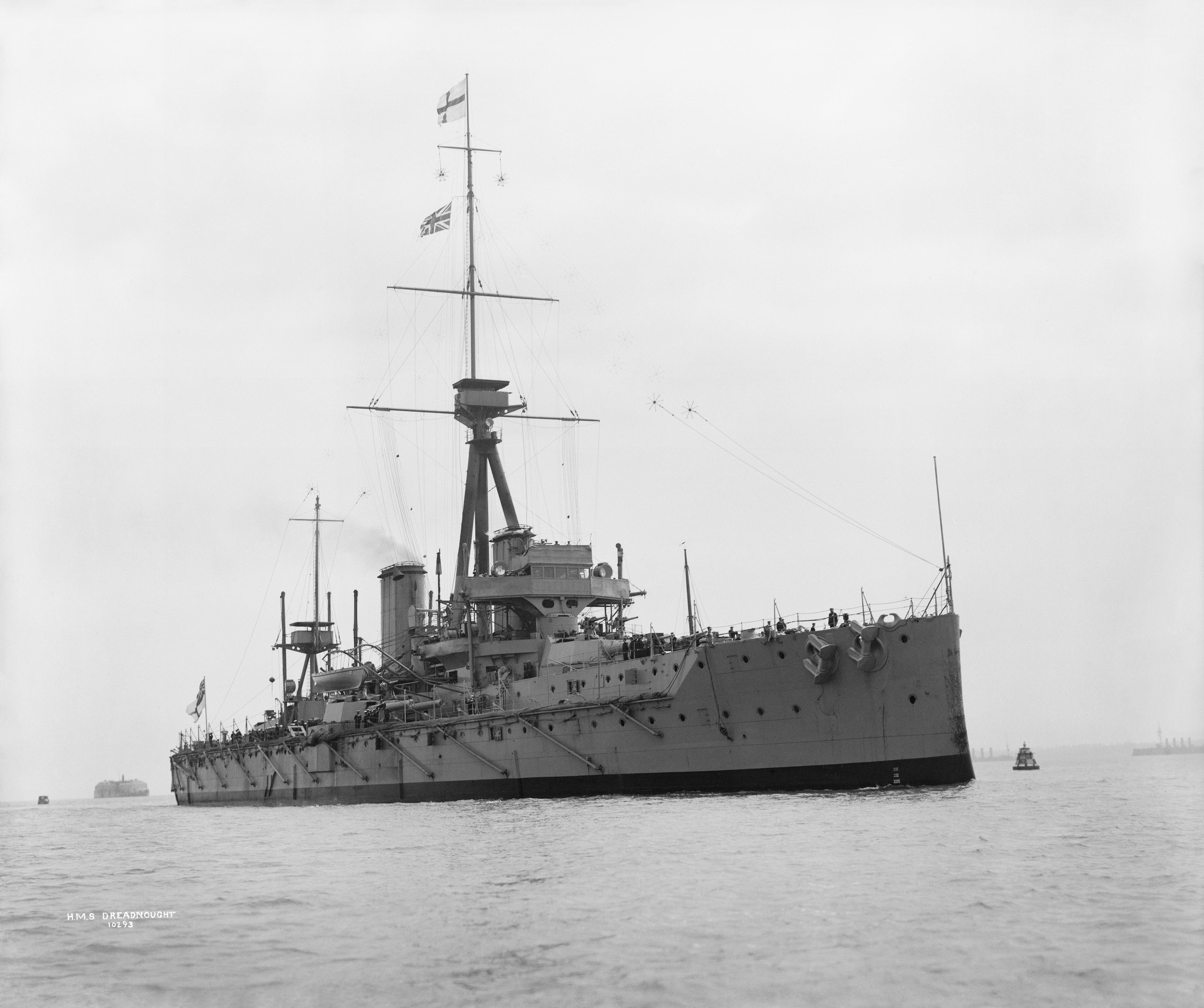
HMS Dreadnought, 1906

- 1914: First operational fighter aircraft, the Vickers F.B.5 (a.k.a. th "Gunbus"), developed from a design by Archibald Low (1888–1956).
- 1916: The tank developed and first used in combat by the British during World War I as a means to break the deadlock of trench warfare. Key co-inventors include Major Walter Gordon Wilson (1874–1957) and Sir William Tritton (1875–1946).
- 1916: The first effective depth charge, an anti-submarine warfare weapon, developed from a design by Herbert Taylor at the RN Torpedo and Mine School, HMS Vernon.
- 1916: The Livens Projector, a weapon, created by William Howard Livens (1889–1964).
- 1917: Dazzle camouflage created by Norman Wilkinson (1878–1971).
- 1917: ASDIC active sonar, the first practical underwater active sound-detection apparatus, developed by Canadian physicist Robert William Boyle and English physicist Albert Beaumont Wood (1890–1964).
- 1940s: High-explosive squash head, a type of ammunition, invented by Sir Charles Dennistoun Burney (1888–1968).
- 1941: The Fairbairn–Sykes fighting knife invented by William Ewart Fairbairn (1885–1960) and Eric A. Sykes (1883–1945).
- 1941–1942: The Bailey bridge – a type of portable, pre-fabricated, truss bridge – invented by Donald Bailey (1901–1985). Field Marshal Montgomery emphasised the importance of the Bailey bridge in Britain winning the war.
- 1943: The bouncing bomb invented by Barnes Wallis (1887–1979).
- 1943: H2S radar (airborne radar to aid bomb targeting) invented by Alan Blumlein (1903–1942). Blumlein died in a plane crash during a secret trial of the H2S system.
- 1950: The steam catapult, a device used to launch aircraft from aircraft carriers, developed by Commander Colin C. Mitchell RNR.
- 1960s: Chobham armour, a type of vehicle armour, developed by a team headed by Gilbert Harvey of the FVRDE at the tank research centre on Chobham Common, Surrey.
- 1960: Harrier jump jet developed by Hawker Aircraft of Kingston upon Thames following an approach by the Bristol Aeroplane Company in 1957.
- Late 1970s: Stun grenades developed by the British Army's SAS.

== Mining ==
- 1780 BCE: The first modern Shovel found in Cheshire dated to 1780 BCE found in the Alderley Edge Mines.
- 1712: The Newcomen Engine invented by Thomas Newcomen (1664–1729); from c. 1705 Newcomen was first to use a Beam engine to pump water from mines.
- 1815: The Davy lamp, a safety lamp, invented by Humphry Davy (1778–1829).
- 1815: The Geordie lamp, a safety lamp, invented by George Stephenson (1781–1848).

== Musical instruments ==
- 1695: Northumbrian smallpipes (a.k.a. Northumbrian pipes) associated with Northumberland and Tyne and Wear.
- 1711: The Tuning fork invented by John Shore (c. 1662–1752).
- 1798: The harp lute invented by Edward Light (c. 1747-c. 1832); Light patented the instrument in 1816.
- Early 19th century: The Irish flute is not an instrument indigenous to Ireland; a key figure in its development was English inventor and flautist Charles Nicholson (1775–1810).
- 1829: The concertina invented by Charles Wheatstone (1802–1875).
- Early 20th century: The theatre organ developed by Robert Hope-Jones (1859–1914).
- 1870: Carbon microphone, invented by David Edward Hughes.
- 1968: The logical bassoon, an electronically controlled version of the bassoon, developed by Giles Brindley (born 1926).

== Photography ==
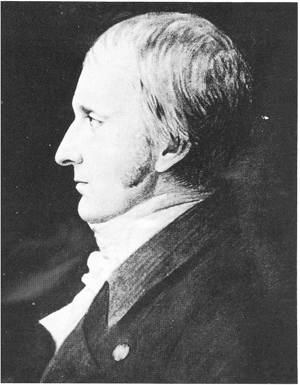
Thomas Wedgwood, copied images chemically to permanent media by 1800

- Before 1800: Method of copying images chemically to permanent media devised by Thomas Wedgwood (1771–1805).
- 1838: The Stereoscope, a device for displaying three-dimensional images, invented by Charles Wheatstone (1802–1875).
- 1840: Calotype or Talbotype invented by William Fox Talbot (1800–1877).
- 1850s: The Collodion process, an early photographic process, invented by Frederick Scott Archer (1813–1857).
- 1850s: The Ambrotype invented by Frederick Scott Archer (1813–1857) and Peter Wickens Fry (1795–1860).
- 1861: The Collodion-albumen process, an early dry plate process, invented by Joseph Sidebotham (father of Joseph Watson Sidebotham).
- 1871: The dry plate process, the first economically successful and durable photographic medium, invented by Richard Leach Maddox (1816–1902).
- 1878: The Horse in Motion or Sallie Gardner at a Gallop, a precursor to the development of motion pictures, created by Eadweard Muybridge (1830–1904).
- 1879: The Zoopraxiscope, which may be considered the first movie projector, created by Eadweard Muybridge (1830–1904).
- 1880s: Method of intensifying plates with mercuric iodide devised by B. J. Edwards (1838–1914); Edwards pioneered also the construction and design of instantaneous shutters.
- 1887: Celluloid motion pictures created by William Friese-Greene (1855–1921).
- 1906: Kinemacolor, the first successful colour motion picture process, invented by George Albert Smith (1864–1959).

== Publishing firsts ==
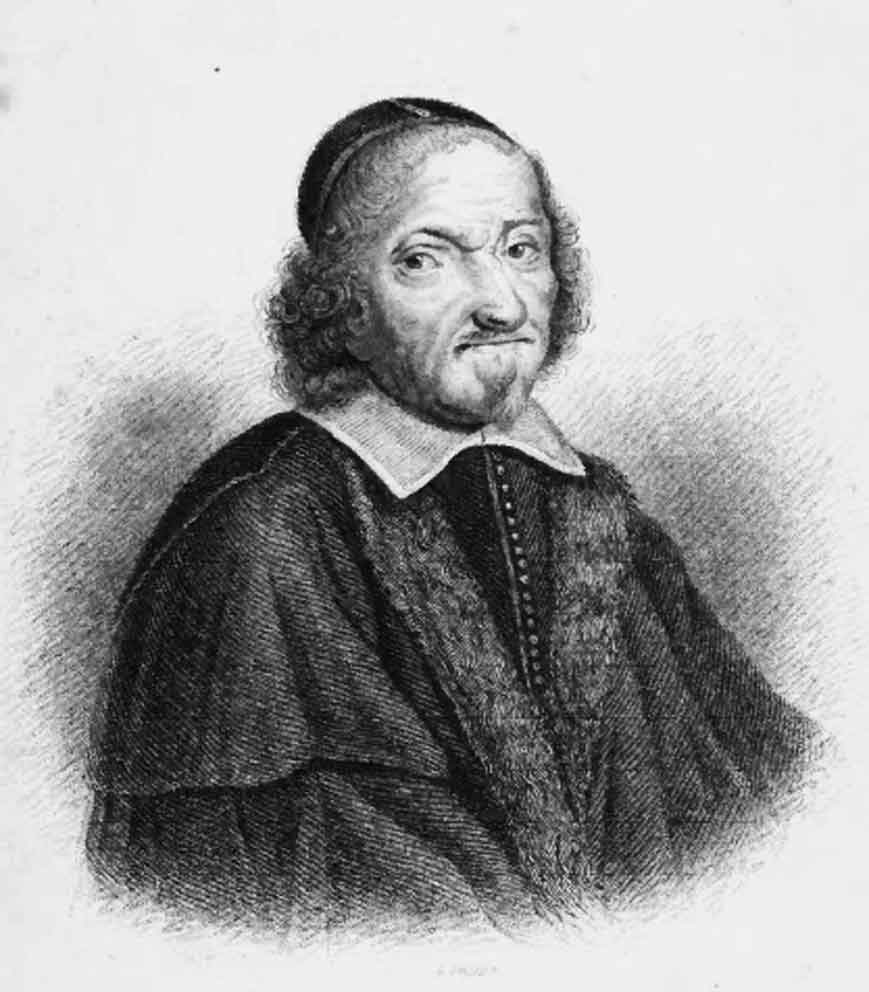
Myles Coverdale, produced first complete printed English Bible, 1535

- 1475: First book printed in the English language, Recuyell of the Historyes of Troye, by William Caxton (c. 1422–c. 1491); eighteen copies survive.
- 1534: Cambridge University Press granted letters patent by Henry VIII; continuous operation since makes it the world's oldest publisher and printer.
- 1535: First complete printed translation of the Bible into English produced by Myles Coverdale (1488–1569).
- 1665: Philosophical Transactions, the first journal exclusively devoted to science, established by the Royal Society of London; it is also the world's longest-running scientific journal.
- British Raj period: the first definite map of India drawn by English cartographers.
- Mid-19th century: First noted journal club by English surgeon Sir James Paget (1814–1899); recalling in his memoirs time spent at St. Bartholomew's Hospital in London, Paget describes "a kind of club [. . .] a small room over a baker's shop near the Hospital-gate where we could sit and read the journals."
- 1893: Benjamin Daydon Jackson prepares the first volume of Index Kewensis, first publication aiming to register all botanical names for seed plants at the rank of species and genera.

== Science ==
=== Physics ===
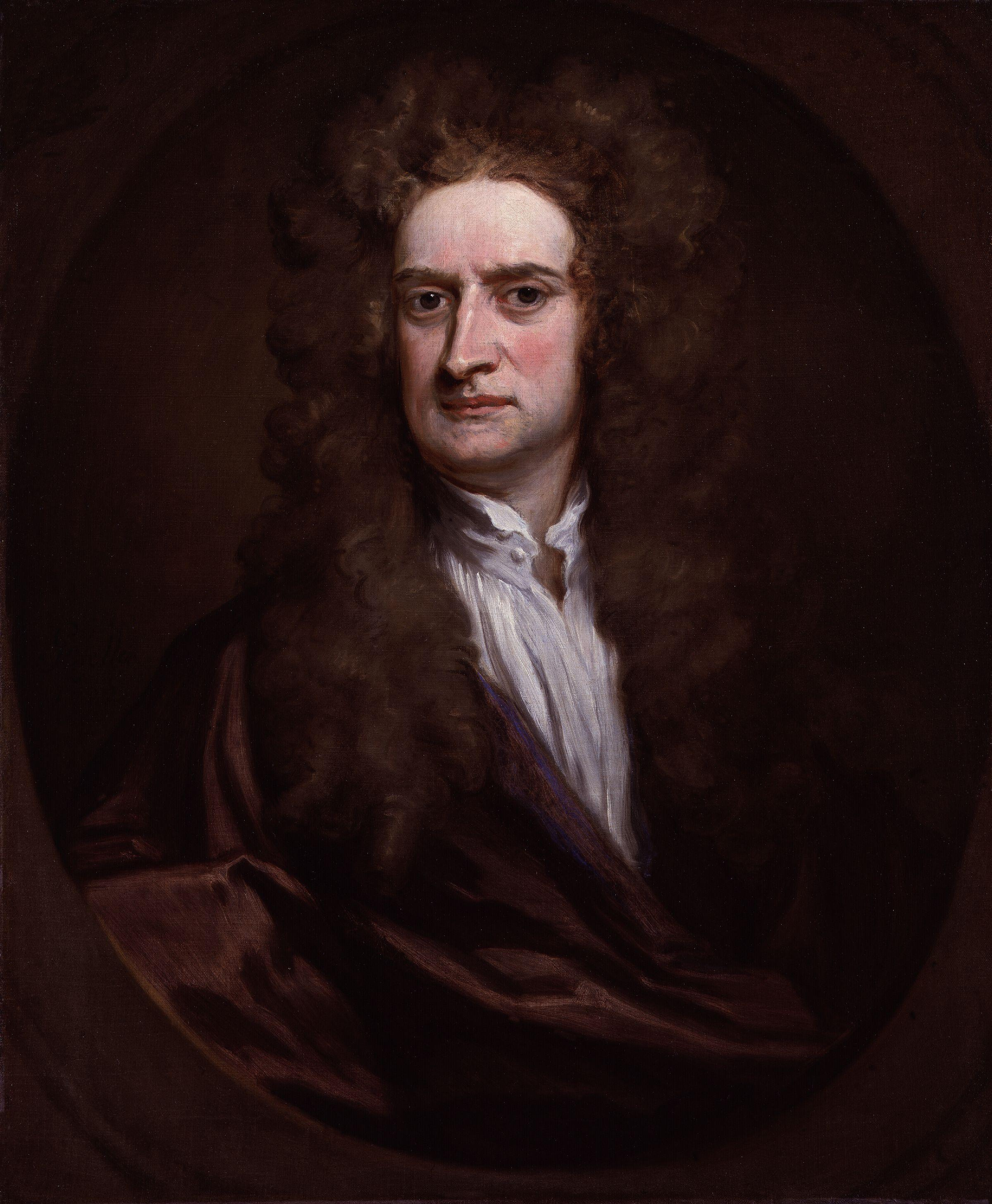
Sir Isaac Newton, a giant of the Scientific Revolution

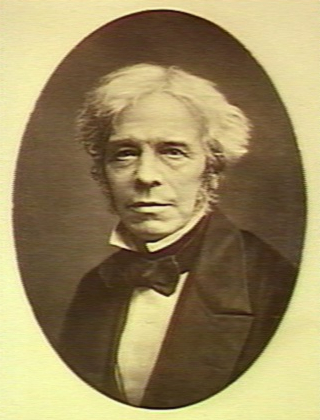
Michael Faraday, made key discoveries relating to electricity, 1820s–1840s

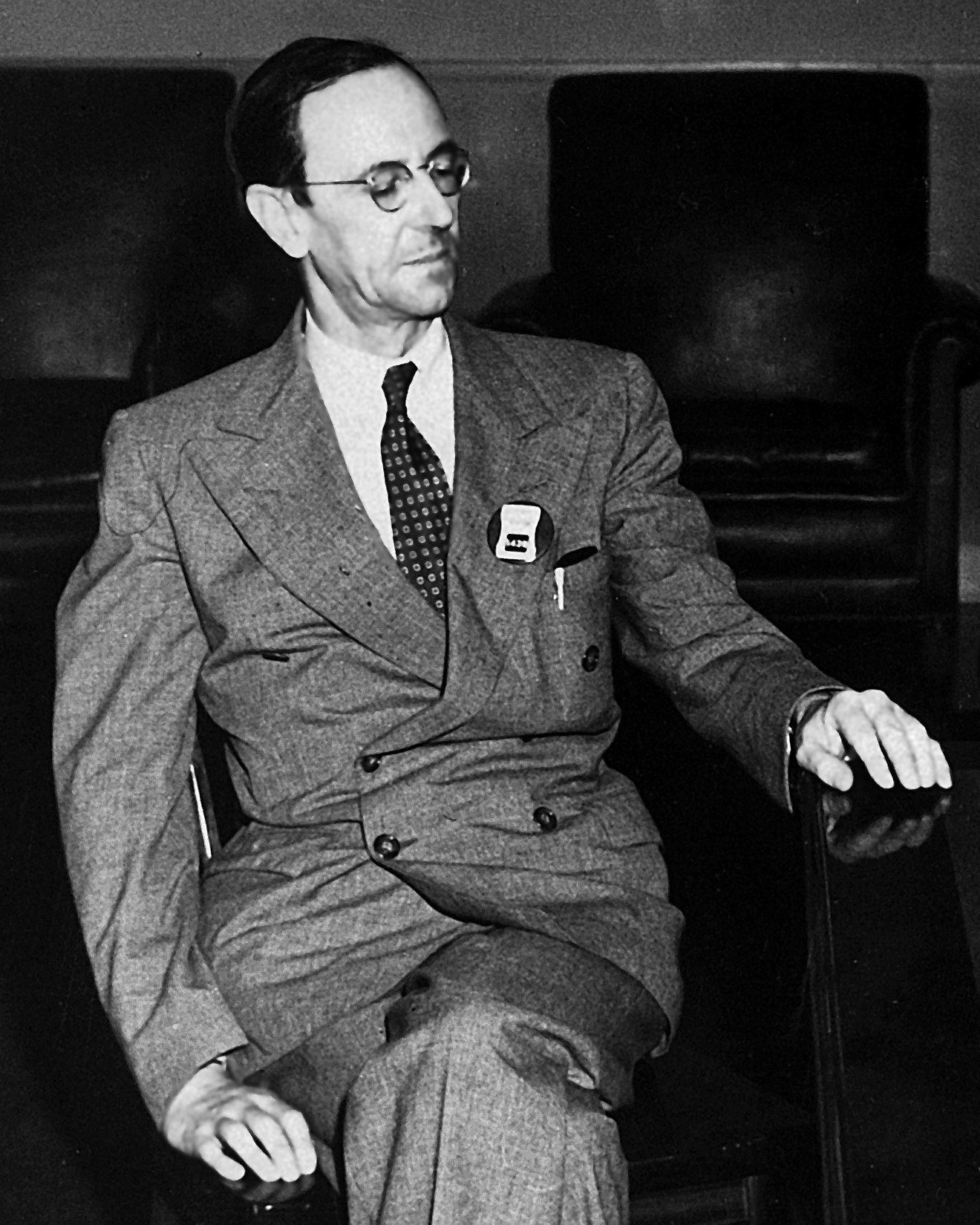
Sir James Chadwick, awarded 1935 Nobel Prize in Physics for his discovery of the neutron in 1932

- 1600: Recognition that the Earth was a giant magnet, by William Gilbert (1544–1603) in his six-book work De Magnete; De Magnete was known all over Europe, and was almost certainly an influence on Galileo.
- 1660: Hooke's law (equation describing elasticity) proposed by Robert Hooke (1635–1703).
- 1666–1675: Theories on optics proposed by Sir Isaac Newton (1642–1726/7); Newton published Opticks in 1704.
- 1687: Law of universal gravitation formulated in the Principia by Sir Isaac Newton (1642–1726/7).
- 1687: Newton's laws of motion formulated in the Principia.
- 1800: Infrared radiation discovered by Sir William Herschel (1738–1822).
- 1802: Theory on physiological basis of colour vision proposed by Thomas Young (1773–1829).
- 1803–1807: Evidence for a wave theory of light discovered by Thomas Young (1773–1829).
- 1823: Electromagnet invented by William Sturgeon (1783–1850).
- 1831: Discovery that electric current could be generated by altering magnetic fields (the principle underlying modern power generation) by Michael Faraday (1791–1867).
- 1845: Proposition that light and electromagnetism are related by Michael Faraday (1791–1867).
- 1845–1847: Demonstration that electric circuits obey the law of the conservation of energy and that electricity is a form of energy (first law of thermodynamics) by James Joule (1818–1889); the unit of energy the Joule is named after him.
- 1871 and 1885: Discovery of the phenomenon Rayleigh scattering (which can be used to explain why the sky is blue), and prediction of the existence of surface waves by John Strutt, 3rd Baron Rayleigh (1842–1919).
- 1897: Discovery of the electron by J. J. Thomson (1856–1940).
- 1911: Discovery of the Rutherford model of the Atom by Ernest Rutherford (1871–1937).
- 1912: Invention of the mass spectrometer by J. J. Thomson (1856–1940).
- 1912: Bragg's law and the field of X-ray crystallography, an important tool for elucidating the crystal structure of substances, discovered by William Henry Bragg (1862–1942) and William Lawrence Bragg (1890–1971).
- 1913: Discovery of isotopes by J. J. Thomson (1856–1940).
- 1917: Discovery of the Proton by Ernest Rutherford (1871–1937).
- 1924: Edward Victor Appleton awarded Nobel Prize in Physics in 1947 for proving the existence of the ionosphere during experiments carried out in 1924.
- 1928: Existence of antimatter predicted by Paul Dirac (1902–1984); Dirac made major contributions to the development of quantum mechanics.
- 1932: Splitting the atom, a fully artificial nuclear reaction and nuclear transmutation, first achieved by English physicist John Cockcroft (1897–1967) and Ireland's Ernest Walton.
- 1932: Discovery of the Neutron by James Chadwick (1891–1974).
- 1935: Possibility of Radar first proven in the "Daventry experiment" by Englishman Arnold Frederic Wilkins (1907–1985) and Scot Robert Watson-Watt.
- 1947: Holography invented in Rugby, England by Hungarian-British Dennis Gabor (1900–1979; fled from Nazi Germany in 1933). The medium was improved by Nicholas J. Phillips (1933–2009), who made it possible to record multi-colour reflection holograms.
- 1947: Discovery of the pion (pi-meson) by Cecil Frank Powell (1903–1969).
- 1964: The Higgs boson, an elementary particle implied by the Higgs field, proposed by Peter Higgs (born 1929) and others to explain why fundamental particles (which are theoretically weightless) might have acquired mass after their formation in the Big Bang.
- 1974: Hawking radiation predicted by Stephen Hawking (1942–2018).

=== Chemistry ===
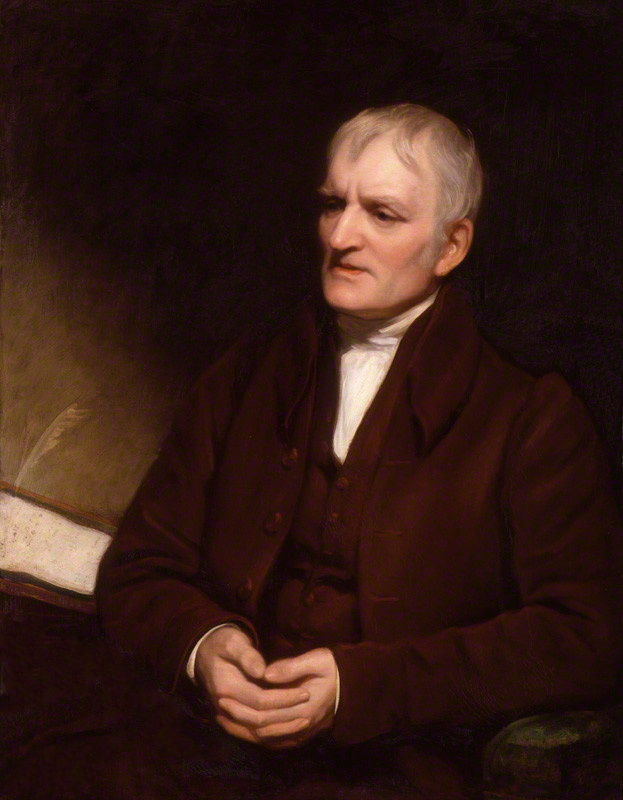
John Dalton, developed modern atomic theory, 1803

- Anglo-Saxon times: Anglo-Saxon goldsmiths used a process similar to cementation; as evidenced by the Staffordshire hoard.
- 1665: Correct theory of combustion first outlined in Micrographia by Robert Hooke (1635–1703); Hooke observed that something (known now as oxygen) is taken from the air and that in its absence combustion quickly ceases, however much heat is applied.
- 1766: Hydrogen discovered by Henry Cavendish (1731–1810); Cavendish described it as a colourless, odourless gas that burns and can form an explosive mixture with air.
- 1775: Oxygen discovered by Joseph Priestley (1733–1804); Priestley called it "dephlogisticated air".
- 1791: William Gregor (25 December 1761 – 11 June 1817) discovered the elemental metal titanium.
- 1801: Charles Hatchett FRS (2 January 1765 – 10 March 1847[1]) discovered the element niobium.
- 1803: William Hyde Wollaston PRS (6 August 1766 – 22 December 1828) discovered the chemical element rhodium.
- 1803: William Hyde Wollaston PRS (6 August 1766 – 22 December 1828) discovered the chemical element palladium.
- 1803: Smithson Tennant FRS (30 November 1761 – 22 February 1815) discovered the element iridium.
- 1803: Smithson Tennant FRS (30 November 1761 – 22 February 1815) discovered the element osmium.
- 1803: Modern atomic theory developed by John Dalton (1766–1844). See also Dalton's law and Law of multiple proportions; Dalton is considered the father of modern chemistry.
- 1807: Sodium isolated by Sir Humphry Davy (1778–1829).

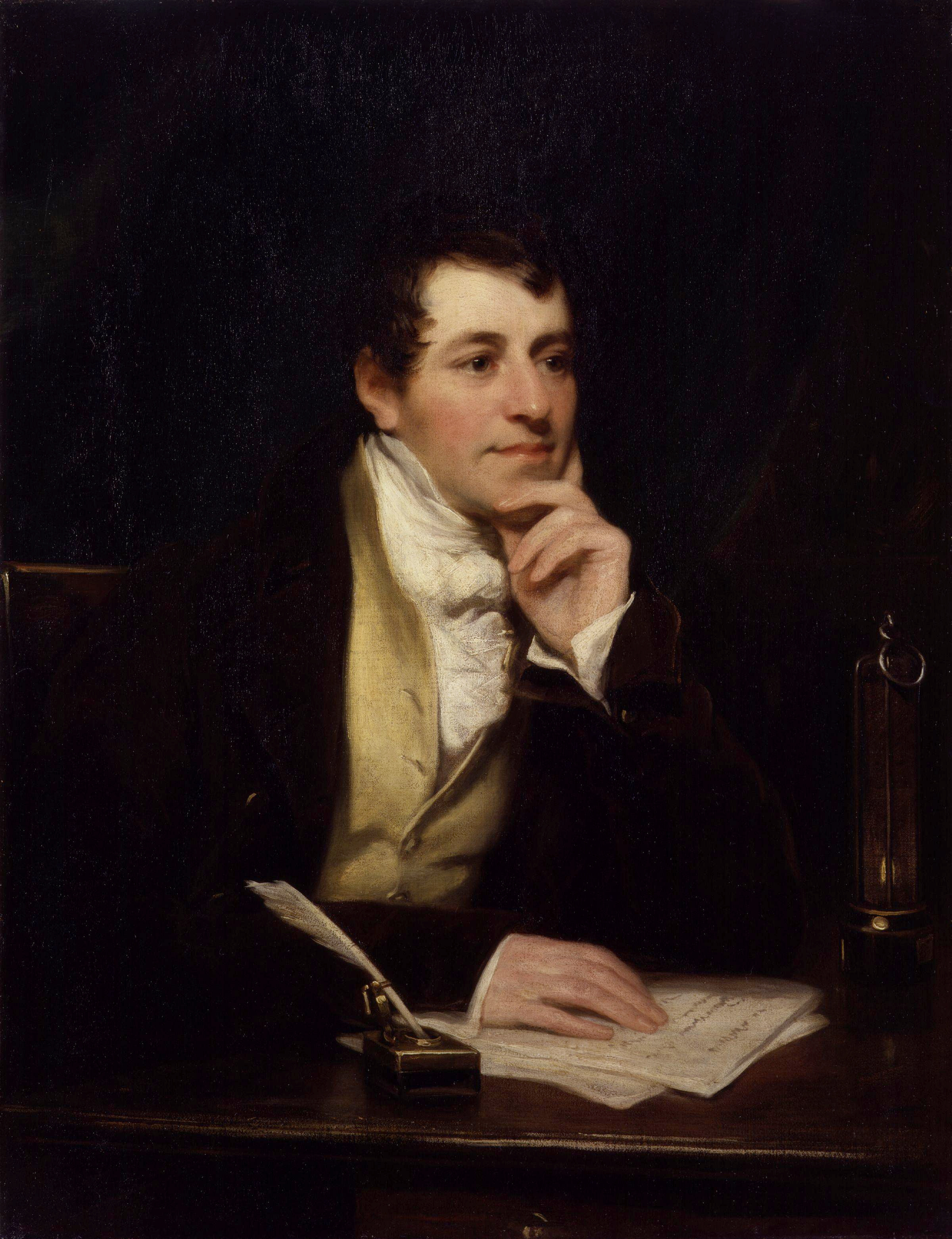
Humphry Davy: isolated various substances using electrolysis; identified them as elements; identified elemental nature of chlorine and iodine, 1807–1813

- 1807: Potassium isolated by Sir Humphry Davy (1778–1829).
- 1808: Calcium isolated by Sir Humphry Davy (1778–1829).
- 1808: Strontium isolated by Sir Humphry Davy (1778–1829).
- 1808: Barium isolated by Sir Humphry Davy (1778–1829).
- 1808: Magnesium isolated by Sir Humphry Davy (1778–1829).
- 1808: Boron isolated by Sir Humphry Davy (1778–1829).
- 1810: Elemental nature of Chlorine discovered by Sir Humphry Davy (1778–1829).
- 1813: Elemental nature of Iodine discovered by Sir Humphry Davy (1778–1829).
- 1825: Benzene, the first known aromatic hydrocarbon, isolated and identified by Michael Faraday (1791–1867).
- 1861: Thallium discovered by William Crookes (1832–1919).
- 1865: Periodic Table devised by John Newlands (1837–1898); his law of octaves was a precursor to the periodic law.
- 1868: Helium discovered in the sun (via spectroscopy) by Norman Lockyer (1836–1920); not until ten years later was it found on Earth.
- 1868: Synthesis of coumarin (one of the first synthetic perfumes), and cinnamic acid via the Perkin reaction by William Henry Perkin (1838–1907).
- 1893: The Weston cell developed by England-born chemist Edward Weston (1850–1936).
- 1894: Argon discovered by English physicist John Strutt, 3rd Baron Rayleigh (1842–1919) and Scot William Ramsay.
- 1898: Morris Travers was an English chemist who with scot Sir William Ramsay discovered xenon, neon and krypton.
- 1901: Silicone discovered and named by Frederic Kipping (1863–1949); according to the nomenclature of modern chemistry, silicone is no longer the correct term, but it remains in common usage.
- 1913: Concept of atomic number introduced by Henry Moseley (1887–1915) in order to fix the inadequacies of Mendeleev's periodic table, which had been based on atomic weight. Isaac Asimov wrote, "In view of what he [Moseley] might still have accomplished … his death might well have been the most costly single death of the War to mankind generally."
- 1913: Existence of isotopes first proposed by Frederick Soddy (1877–1956).
- 1940s / 1950s: Partition chromatography developed by Richard Laurence Millington Synge (1914–1994) and Archer J.P. Martin (1910–2002).
- 1950: VX (nerve agent) invented by Ranajit Ghosh at Porton Down, VX (nerve agent) is the world's most deadly chemical compounds. It only takes 10 milligrams to become a fatal dose.
- 1952: Structure of ferrocene discovered by Geoffrey Wilkinson (1921–1996) and others.
- 1959: First practical hydrogen–oxygen fuel cell developed by Francis Thomas Bacon (1904–1992).
- 1962: First noble gas compound, xenon hexafluoroplatinate, prepared by Neil Bartlett (1932–2008).
- 1985: Buckminsterfullerene discovered by Sir Harry Kroto (1939–2016).

=== Biology ===
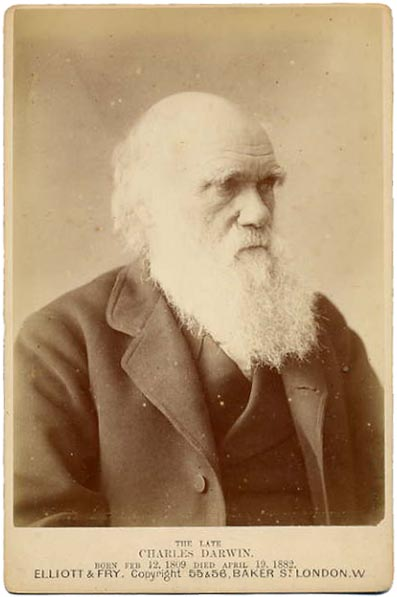
Charles Darwin's theory of evolution published in 1859

- 1665: Cell biology originated by Robert Hooke (1635–1703), who discovered the first cells in the course of describing the microscopic compartments within cork.
- Early 19th century: the first recognition of what fossils were by Mary Anning.
- 1839: The identification and discovery of 150 mosses, lichens, liverworts, flowering plants and algae on the Kerguelen Islands by botanist Joseph Dalton Hooker. He later said of his gatherings "many of my best little lichens were gathered by hammering out the turfs or sitting on them till they thawed."
- 1855: The discovery of the first coal ball by Joseph Dalton Hooker who later on with partner William Binney made the first scientific description of coal balls.
- 1859: Theories of evolution by natural selection and sexual selection set out in On the Origin of Species by Charles Darwin (1809–1882).
- 1883: The practice of Eugenics developed by Sir Francis Galton (1822–1911), applying his half-cousin Charles Darwin's theory of evolution to humans.
- 1953: Double-helix structure of DNA determined by Englishman Francis Crick (1916–2004) and American James Watson. Crick was a pioneer in the field of molecular biology.
- 1958: the first cloning of an animal, a frog using intact nuclei from the somatic cells of a Xenopus tadpole by Sir John Gurdon.
- 1950 onward: the pioneering of the use of Xenopus eggs to translate microinjected messenger RNA molecules by Sir John Gurdon and fellow researchers, a technique which has been widely used to identify the proteins encoded and to study their function.
- 1960 onwards: Pioneering observation-based research into the behaviour of chimpanzees (our closest relatives in the animal kingdom) conducted by Jane Goodall (born 1934).
- 1977: DNA sequencing by chain termination developed by Frederick Sanger (1918–2013). Sanger won the Nobel Prize for Chemistry twice.
- 1977: Discovery of introns in eukaryotic DNA and the mechanism of gene-splicing by Richard J. Roberts (born 1943).
- 1996: Dolly the Sheep born as a result of Nuclear transfer, a form of cloning put into practice by Ian Wilmut (born 1944) and Keith Campbell (1954–2012).
- 2016: Scientists at the British bio-tech company Oxitec, in an attempt to stop the spread of dengue fever genetically engineer a 'sudden death' mosquito which after mating successfully with a wild female, any offspring produced will not survive to adulthood and the lethal gene is passed on from the female to any male they mate with and the cycle continues. 3,019,000 mosquitos were released on the Grand Cayman Islands and after three months 80% of the population of mosquitos in the target area had vanished.

=== Mathematics and statistics ===
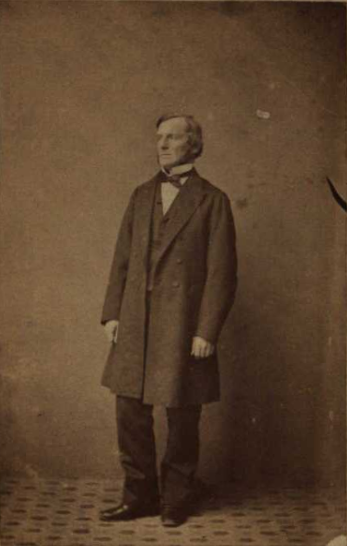
George Boole, whose Boolean algebra (1854) laid the foundations of the Information Age

- 1630–1632: The slide rule invented by William Oughtred (1574–1660), developing on work by Edmund Gunter (1581–1626) and Edmund Wingate (1596–1656).
- 1631: The "x" symbol for multiplication and the abbreviations "sin" and "cos" for the sine and cosine functions devised by William Oughtred (1574–1660) in Clavis Mathematicae (The Key to Mathematics).
- 1631: The symbols for "is less than" and "is greater than", along with other innovations, devised in the posthumously published algebra text Artis Analyticae Praxis by Thomas Harriot (c. 1560–1621).
- 1687: Calculus developed by Sir Isaac Newton (1642–1726/7), as set out in his Principia Mathematica.
- 1763 onwards: Key contributions made to the development of statistics by: Thomas Bayes (c. 1701–1761) (Bayes' theorem); Florence Nightingale (1820–1910) (statistical graphics); Francis Galton (1822–1911) (standard deviation, correlation, regression, questionnaires); Karl Pearson (1857–1936) (correlation coefficient, chi-square); William Gosset (1876–1937) (Student's t-distribution); Ronald Fisher (1890–1962) (Analysis of variance); Frank Yates (1902–1994).
- 1854: Boolean algebra, the basis for digital logic, proposed by George Boole (1815–1864).
- 1876: Connection between energy, matter and the curvature of space proposed in s:On the Space-Theory of Matter by William Kingdon Clifford (1845–1879), forty years before Einstein's general theory of relativity.
- c. 1880: The Venn diagram devised by John Venn (1834–1923).
- 1884: Reformulation of Maxwell's equations into the four we know now by Oliver Heaviside (1850–1925).
- 1901: Discipline of modern mathematical statistics developed by Karl Pearson (1857–1936).

=== Astronomy ===
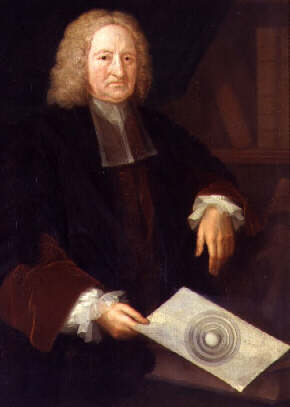
Edmond Halley, determined the periodicity of Halley's Comet in 1705

- 1609: First drawing of the Moon through a telescope by Thomas Harriot (c. 1560 – 1621); Harriot achieved this on 26 July 1609: over four months before Galileo.
- 1610: Sunspots discovered by Thomas Harriot (c. 1560–1621).
- 1668: Newtonian telescope invented by Sir Isaac Newton (1642–1727).
- 1705: Periodicity of Halley's Comet determined by Edmond Halley (1656–1742).
- 1712–1717: The Planetarium created by French-born Briton John Theophilus Desaguliers (1683–1784).
- 1758: Achromatic doublet lens patented by John Dollond (1706–1761).
- 1781: Discovery of the planet Uranus by Sir William Herschel (1738–1822); Herschel also discovered the moons Titania (1787), Oberon (1787), Enceladus (1789), and Mimas (1789).
- 1783: Existence of black holes first proposed by John Michell (1724–1793); Michell was first to suggest that double stars might be attracted to each other (1767), and he invented the torsion balance (before 1783).
- 1843: Existence and position of Neptune predicted, using only mathematics, by John Couch Adams (1819–1892).
- 1845: Nature of spiral galaxies discovered by William Parsons, 3rd Earl of Rosse (1800–1867).
- 1846: Discovery of Triton by William Lassell (1799–1880); Lassell also discovered the moons Hyperion (1848), Ariel (1851), and Umbriel (1851).
- 1924: The Eddington limit – the natural limit to the luminosity of stars, or the radiation generated by accretion onto a compact object – discovered by Sir Arthur Stanley Eddington (1882–1944).
- 1930s–1950s: Important contributions to the development of radio astronomy made by Bernard Lovell (1913–2012).
- 1946–1954: Pioneering theories of Nucleosynthesis (the formation of chemical elements in stars and supernova) proposed by Sir Fred Hoyle (1915–2001); in 1949, Hoyle coined the term "Big Bang".
- 1966 onwards: Important contributions to cosmology and (from 1973)quantum gravity made by Stephen Hawking (1942–2018), especially in the context of black holes.
- 1967: Pulsars discovered by English radio astronomer Antony Hewish (1924–2021) and one of his graduate students, Northern Irish Jocelyn Bell.
- Late 1960s / early 1970s: Aperture synthesis, used for accurate location and imaging of weak radio sources in the field of radio astronomy, developed by Martin Ryle (1918–1984) and Antony Hewish (1924–2021).

=== Geology and meteorology ===
- 1802: Nomenclature system for clouds developed by meteorology pioneer Luke Howard (1772–1864).
- 1815: First geological map of Great Britain created by William Smith (1769–1839); Smith is responsible, as well, for the observation that fossils can be used to work out the relative ages of rocks and strata (Principle of Faunal Succession).
- 1820: The dew-point hygrometer, an instrument used for measuring the moisture content in the atmosphere, invented by John Frederic Daniell (1790–1845).
- 1820s: Scientific study of dinosaurs initiated by Gideon Mantell (1790–1852).
- 1861: First weather map created by Francis Galton (1822–1911).
- 1880: The Seismograph, for detecting and measuring the strength of earthquakes, invented by John Milne (1850–1913).
- 1911 onwards: Geochronology pioneered by Arthur Holmes (1890–1965).
- 1938–1964: The Callendar effect, a theory linking rising carbon dioxide concentrations in the atmosphere to global temperature (Global warming), proposed by Guy Stewart Callendar (1898–1964).

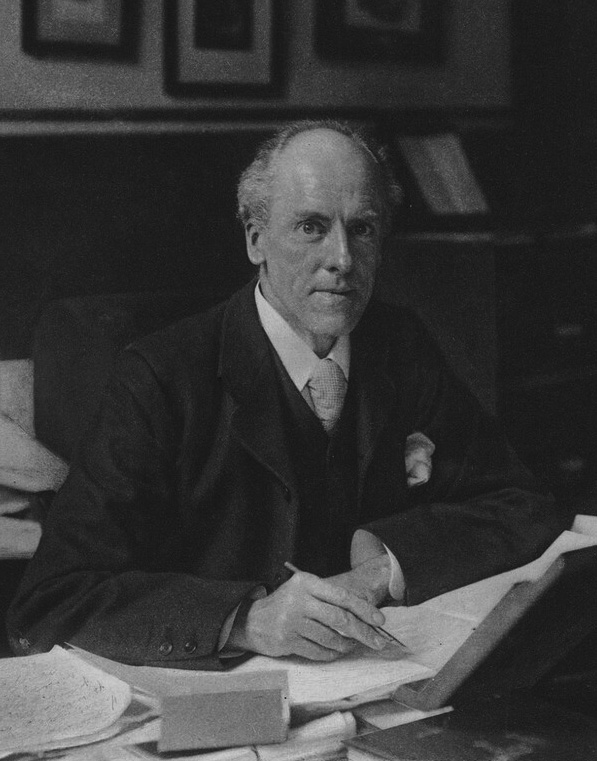
Karl Pearson's Grammar of Science (1892) influenced the young Einstein

=== Philosophy of science ===
- c. 1240s: An early framework for the scientific method, based in Aristotelian commentaries, proposed by English statesman, scientist and Christian theologian Robert Grosseteste (c. 1175–1253).
- 1267: Early form of the scientific method articulated in Opus Majus by Roger Bacon (c. 1214?-c. 1292?).
- 1620: Baconian method, a forerunner of the scientific method, proposed in the Novum Organum by Sir Francis Bacon (1561–1626).
- 1892: Scope and method of science proposed in The Grammar of Science by Karl Pearson (1857–1936); the book was a pivotal influence on the young Albert Einstein and contained several ideas that were later to become part of his theories.

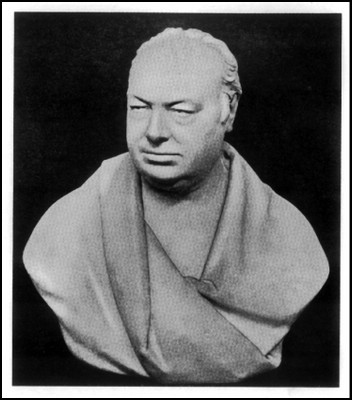
Henry Maudslay, a founding father of machine tool technology

=== Scientific instruments ===
- 1630–1632: The slide rule invented by William Oughtred (1574–1660), developing on work by Edmund Gunter (1581–1626) and Edmund Wingate (1596–1656).
- 1630s: The micrometer invented by William Gascoigne (1612–1644).
- 1665: Compound microscope with 30x magnification developed by Robert Hooke (1635–1703); Hooke published Micrographia in 1665.
- 1668: The marine barometer invented by Robert Hooke (1635–1703).
- 1677: The Coggeshall slide rule, a.k.a. the carpenter's slide rule, invented by Henry Coggeshall (1623–1691).
- 1763: Triple achromatic lens invented by Peter Dollond (1731–1820).
- 1784: The Atwood machine, for demonstrating the law of uniformly accelerated motion, invented by George Atwood (1745–1807).
- c. 1805: First bench micrometer – the "Lord Chancellor", capable of measuring to one ten-thousandth of an inch – invented by Henry Maudslay (1771–1831), a founding father of machine tool technology.
- 1833: Wheatstone bridge invented by Samuel Hunter Christie (1784–1865); improved and popularised in 1843 by Charles Wheatstone (1802–1875).
- 1972: The Sinclair Executive, the world's first small electronic pocket calculator, invented by Sir Clive Sinclair (1940–2021).

== Sport ==
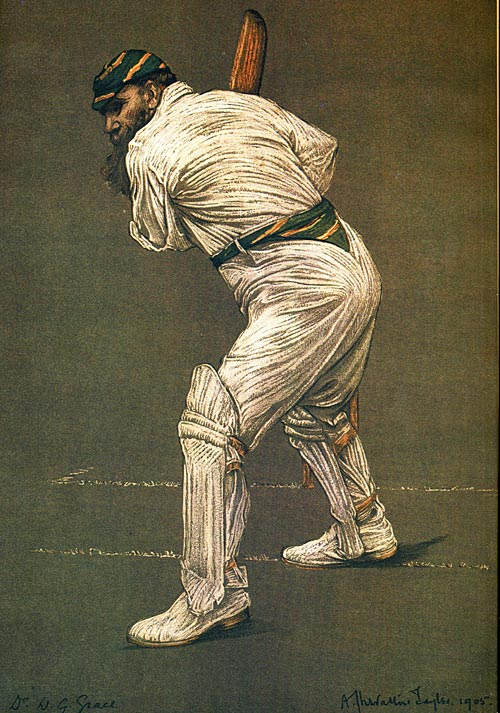
W. G. Grace (1848–1915); 1598 saw the earliest definite reference to cricket

- Before 1299: Bowls or lawn bowls can be traced to 13th-century England. The world's oldest surviving bowling green is Southampton Old Bowling Green, first used in 1299.
- Late 15th century: Rounders developed from an older English game known as stoolball.
- Early 16th century: Modern boxing developed from bare-knuckle boxing or prizefighting, a resurfacing of Ancient Greek boxing in England. The first recorded boxing match took place on 6 January 1681 in England, arranged by Christopher Monck, 2nd Duke of Albemarle (1653–1688).
- 1519: World's oldest sporting competition still running, the Kiplingcotes Derby horse-race, established; it has run annually since without a break.
- 1530s: Origin of real tennis played with rackets, popularised by Henry VIII.
- 1598: The earliest definite reference to cricket; the sport may arguably be traced further back to 1301 with written evidence of a game known as creag played by Prince Edward, son of Edward I (Longshanks).
- Aunt Sally, early 17th century.
- After 1660: Thoroughbred horseracing developed in 17th- and 18th-century England; royal support from Charles II, a keen racegoer and owner, made horse-racing popular with the public.
- 1673: Oldest non-equine competition in England, the Scorton Arrow archery tournament, established in Scorton, Yorkshire.
- 1715: Oldest rowing race in the world, Doggett's Coat and Badge established; the race on the River Thames has been held every year since 1715.
- 1744: Earliest description of baseball in A Little Pretty Pocket-Book by John Newbery (1713–1767); the first recorded game of "Bass-Ball" took place in 1749 in Surrey. William Bray (1736–1832) recorded a game of baseball on Easter Monday, 1755 in Guildford, Surrey; the game is considered to have been taken across the Atlantic by English emigrants.
- Early 19th century: Modern field hockey developed in English public schools; the first club was established in 1849 in Blackheath, London.
- 1820s: Ice hockey, a variant of field hockey, invented by British soldiers based in Canada. British soldiers and emigrants to Canada and the United States played their stick-and-ball games on the winter ice and snow; in 1825, John Franklin (1786–1847) wrote during one of his Arctic expeditions: "The game of hockey played on the ice was the morning sport" on Great Bear Lake.

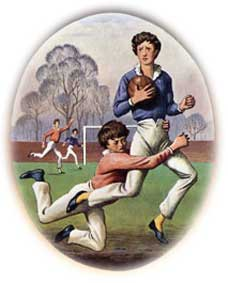
William Webb Ellis at Rugby School, 1823-4

- 1823 or 1824: Invention of Rugby football credited to William Webb Ellis (1806–1872).
- 1850: The format of the modern Olympic Games inspired by William Penny Brookes (1809–1895); see also the Cotswold Olimpick Games.
- c. 1850: A bowling machine for cricket named the Catapulta (a predecessor of the pitching machine) invented by Nicholas "Felix" Wanostrocht (1804–1876).
- 1857: Sheffield F.C. formed by former public school pupils, making it the world's first and oldest Association football club, as acknowledged by The Football Association and FIFA.
- 1867: Coconut shy in Kingston, Surrey.
- 1859–1865: Lawn tennis invented by Harry Gem (1819–1881) and Augurio Perera, a Spanish-born merchant and sportsman based in England.
- 1874–1875: Snooker invented by the British Army in India.
- 1874: Formal codification of the rules of modern Polo established by the Hurlingham Polo Association; polo had been introduced to England in 1834 by the 10th Hussars at Aldershot, Hants, and in 1862 the first polo club, Calcutta Polo Club, was established by two British soldiers, Captain Robert Stewart and (later Major General) Joe Sherer.
- 1880 onwards: Modern rock climbing developed by Walter Parry Haskett Smith (1859–1946), so-called "father of rock climbing".
- 1880s: Table tennis or ping-pong originated in Victorian England as an indoor version of tennis; it was developed and played by the upper class as an after-dinner parlour game.
- 1888: Tiddlywinks patent application by London bank clerk Joseph Assheton Fincher (1863–1900); Tiddlywinks originated as an adult parlour game in Victorian England.
- 1893–1897: Netball developed from early versions of women's basketball at Madame Österberg's College in England.
- 1895: Rugby league created with the establishment of the Northern Rugby Football Union (NRFU) as a breakaway faction of England's Rugby Football Union (RFU).
- 1896: The dartboard-layout used in the game and professional competitive sport of Darts was devised by Lancashire carpenter Brian Gamlin (c. 1852–1903); Gamlin died before he could patent his idea.
- 1899: Mixed martial art (MMA) Bartitsu invented by Edward William Barton-Wright (1860–1951).
- 1948: The first Paralympic games competition, originally the Stoke Mandeville Games, created in England by German-born (from 1945 naturalised) British neurologist Ludwig Guttmann (1899–1980).
- 1954: Sir Roger Bannister (1929–2018) ran the first sub-four-minute mile on 6 May 1954.
- 1979: First modern bungee jumps made from the 250-foot (76 m) Clifton Suspension Bridge in Bristol by members of the Oxford University Dangerous Sports Club.

== Transport ==
=== Aviation ===
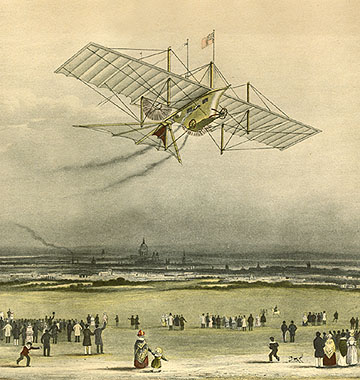
The Aerial Steam Carriage, performed the world's first powered flight in 1848

- 1799: Concept of the modern aeroplane as a fixed-wing flying machine with separate systems for lift, propulsion, and control set forth by Sir George Cayley (1773–1857); Cayley is one of the most important people in the history of Aeronautics and flight: he is sometimes called the "father of aviation".
- 1804: First glider to carry a human being aloft designed by Sir George Cayley (1773–1857). Cayley discovered and identified the four aerodynamic forces of flight: weight, lift, drag, and thrust; Modern aeroplane design is based on those discoveries, along with cambered wings which Cayley also discovered.
- 1837: Pioneering contribution to parachute design made by Robert Cocking (1776–1837); aged 61, Cocking was the first person to be killed in a parachuting accident.
- 1844: Hale rockets, an improved version of the Congreve rocket design that introduced thrust vectoring, invented by William Hale (1797–1870).
- 1848: World's first powered flight (of 30 feet) achieved in Chard, Somerset with the Aerial Steam Carriage by John Stringfellow (1799–1883), 55 years before the Wright brothers; Stringfellow and William Samuel Henson (1812–1888) patented their invention in 1842.
- Late-19th century: The term "air port" first used – to describe the port city Southampton, where some early flying boats landed.

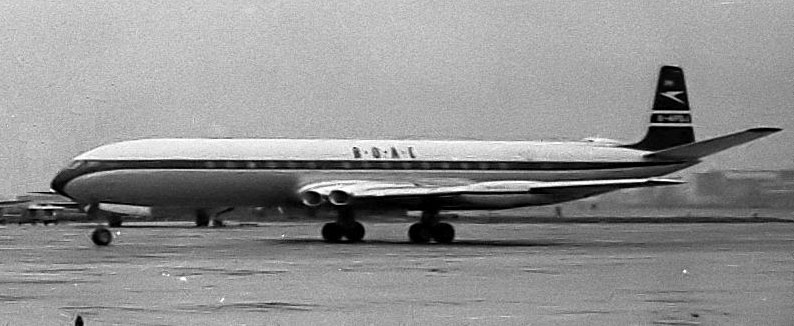
The de Havilland Comet, the first commercial jet airliner, produced in 1949

- 1929: Turbojet engine single-handedly invented by Sir Frank Whittle (1907–1996).
- 1949: First commercial jet airliner, the de Havilland Comet, designed, developed and manufactured by de Havilland.
- 1954: First aircraft capable of supercruise, the English Electric Lightning, designed, developed and manufactured by English Electric.
- 1959: Aerospace engineer John Hodge (1929–2021) migrated to become part of NASA's Space Task Group, which was responsible for America's crewed space programme, Project Mercury.
- 1960: VTOL (Vertical Take-Off and Landing) aircraft (most famously the Harrier) invented by Gordon Lewis (1924–2010), Ralph Hooper (1926–2022), Stanley Hooker (1907–1984) and Sydney Camm (1893–1966); the project developed on ideas by Frenchman Michel Wibault.
- 1965: Concorde The world's first supersonic commercial aircraft (A joint development between British Airways, Air France) invented by Sir James Hamilton (1923–2012); the project was manufactured by BAC, Sud Aviation. It took Concorde three hours, fifteen minutes to fly from London Heathrow to New York JFK.

=== Railways ===
- 1825: Opening of the Stockton and Darlington Railway, the world's first operational steam passenger railway; it was taken over by the North Eastern Railway in 1863.
- 1830: Opening of the Liverpool and Manchester Railway, the first inter-city steam-powered railway; the railway was absorbed by the Grand Junction Railway in 1845.
- 1838: Opening of the first stretch of the Great Western Railway, from London Paddington station to (the original) Maidenhead station, engineered by Isambard Kingdom Brunel (1806–1859).

==== Locomotives ====
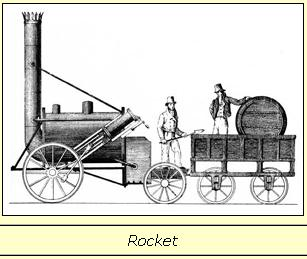
Stephenson's Rocket, 1829

- 1802: First full-scale railway steam locomotive built by Richard Trevithick (1771–1833). This built on the endeavours of two other Englishmen, engineer Thomas Savery (c.1650–1715), son of Devon, and the first practical steam engine built in 1712 by Londoner Thomas Newcomen (c.1664–1729). James Watt did not invent the steam engine. Rather Watt, prompted by English backer and manufacturer Matthew Boulton, effected improvements sufficient to make the invention commercially viable.
- 1812: First commercially viable steam locomotive, the twin cylinder Salamanca, designed and built by Matthew Murray (1765–1826) of Holbeck.
- 1813: First practical steam locomotive to rely simply on the adhesion of iron wheels on iron rails, Puffing Billy, built by William Hedley (1779–1843).
- 1814: First successful flanged-wheel adhesion locomotive, the Blücher, built by George Stephenson (1781–1848).
- 1824: First steam locomotive to carry passengers on a public rail-line, the Locomotion No. 1, built by Robert Stephenson (1803–1859), son of George Stephenson.
- 1829: Stephenson's Rocket built by George Stephenson (1781–1848) and his son Robert Stephenson (1803–1859); the Rocket was not the first steam locomotive, but it was the first to bring together several innovations to produce the most advanced locomotive of its day.
- 1829: The Sans Pareil, a less advanced competitor of Stephenson's Rocket, built by Timothy Hackworth (1786–1850).
- 1829: The Stourbridge Lion, first steam locomotive to be operated in the United States, built by Foster, Rastrick and Company of Stourbridge, Worcestershire, now West Midlands; the manufacturing company was headed by James Foster (1786–1853) and John Urpeth Rastrick (1780–1856).
- 1835: Der Adler the first steam locomotive in Germany. Built by George & Robert Stephenson in Newcastle.
- 1923: The Flying Scotsman built to a design by Sir Nigel Gresley (1876–1941); the Flying Scotsman was in 1934 the first steam locomotive to be authenticated at reaching 100 miles per hour (160.9 km/h) in passenger service.

==== Other railway developments ====
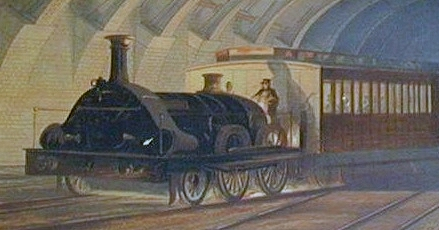
The London Underground, opened 1863

- 1842: The Edmondson railway ticket invented by Thomas Edmondson (1792–1851); British Rail used Edmondson tickets until February 1990.
- 1852 onwards: Numerous inventions for railways by John Ramsbottom (1814–1897), including: the split piston ring (1852), the Ramsbottom safety valve (1855), the Displacement lubricator (1860), and the water trough (1860).
- 1863: Opening of the world's oldest underground railway, the London Underground, a.k.a. the Tube; the Tube is the oldest rapid transit system, and it was the first underground railway to operate electric trains.
- Late 1940s: Maglev, the use of magnetic levitation to move vehicles without touching the ground, invented by Eric Laithwaite (1921–1997).
- 1981: The Advanced Passenger Train (APT), an experimental high-speed train that pioneered tilting, introduced by British Rail.

=== Roads ===
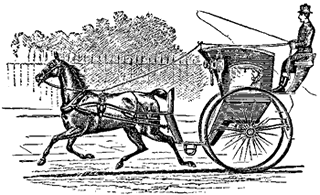
The Hansom cab, invented by Joseph Hansom in 1834

- 1804: The seat belt invented by Sir George Cayley (1773–1857).
- 1808: Tension-spoke wire wheels invented by Sir George Cayley (1773–1857).
- 1829: First practical steam fire engine invented by John Braithwaite the younger (1797–1880).
- 1834: The Hansom cab, a type of horse-drawn carriage, invented by Joseph Hansom (1803–1882).
- 1868: First traffic lights (manually operated and gas-lit) installed outside London's Houses of Parliament; invented by John Peake Knight (1828–1886).
- c. 1870: "Ariel", a penny-farthing bicycle, developed by James Starley (1831–1881).
- 1876: The legal collection of 70,000 seeds from the rubber-bearing tree Hevea brasiliensis which led to the discovery of the perfect growing climate and locations for rubber trees by Sir Henry Alexander Wickham. Most commercial rubber plants are descended from the seeds he took to Kew Gardens
- 1884:Thomas Parker claimed to have invented the first electric car.
- 1885: First commercially successful safety bicycle, "the Rover", developed by John Kemp Starley (1855–1901).
- 1901: Tarmac patented by Edgar Purnell Hooley (1860–1942).
- c. 1902: The invention of the Bowden cable popularly attributed to Sir Frank Bowden (1848–1921), founder and owner of the Raleigh Bicycle Company.
- 1910: Opening of the oldest existing driving school and first formal driving tuition provider, the British School of Motoring, in Peckham, London.
- 1922: Horstmann suspension, a coil spring suspension system commonly used on western tanks, invented by Sidney Horstmann (1881–1962).
- 1926: First automated traffic lights in England deployed in Piccadilly Circus in 1926; outside of London, Wolverhampton was in 1927 the first British town to introduce automated traffic lights.
- 1934: The Cat's eye, a safety device used in road marking, invented by Percy Shaw (1890–1976).
- 1934: The Belisha beacon introduced by Leslie Hore-Belisha (1893–1957).
- 1962: First modern Formula One car, the Lotus 25, designed by Colin Chapman (1928–1982) for Team Lotus; the design incorporated the first fully stressed monocoque chassis to appear in automobile racing.
- 1971: the world's first Bus Rapid Transit system, the Runcorn Busway, first conceived by Arthur Ling.
- 1985: The Sinclair C5, a one-person battery electric vehicle, invented by Sir Clive Sinclair (1940–2021).
- 1997: World Land Speed Record, 1,228 km/h (763 mph), achieved by ThrustSSC, a jet-propelled car designed and built in England. Project director: Richard Noble (born 1946); designed by Ron Ayers (born 1932), Glynne Bowsher and Jeremy Bliss; piloted by Andy Green (born 1962).

=== Sea ===
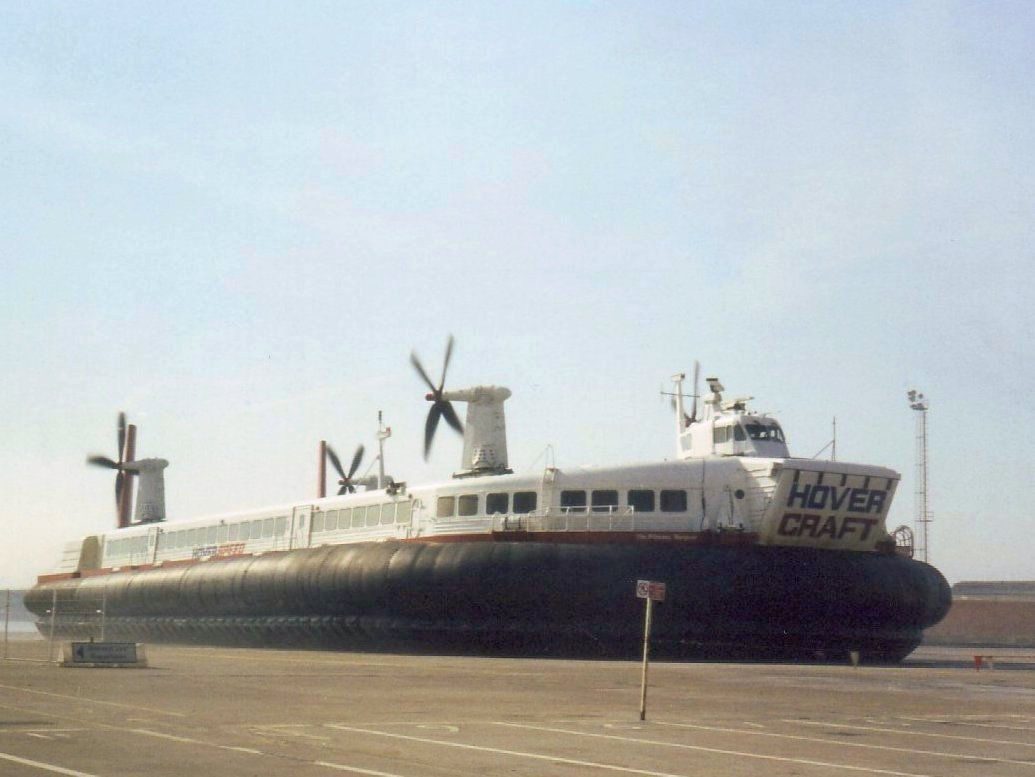
Hovercraft, invented by Sir Christopher Cockerell in 1955

- 1578: The first submersible (a small, submarine-like vehicle) of whose construction there exists reliable information designed by Englishman William Bourne (c. 1535–1582) in his book Inventions or Devises; Dutchman Cornelius Drebbel put Bourne's concept into action in 1620.
- 1691: A diving bell capable of allowing its occupier to remain submerged for extended periods of time, and fitted with a window for the purpose of underwater exploration, designed by Edmund Halley (1656–1742), best known for computing the orbit of Halley's Comet.
- c. 1730: The octant invented by English mathematician John Hadley (1682–1744); American optician Thomas Godfrey developed the instrument independently at approximately the same time.
- 1743: The "Whirling Speculum", a device used to locate the horizon in foggy or misty conditions, invented by John Serson (died 1744); Serson's Speculum can be seen as a precursor to the gyroscope.
- 1757: First sextant made by John Bird (1709–1776), adapting the principle of Hadley's octant.
- 1785: The lifeboat invented and patented by Lionel Lukin (1742–1834); William Wouldhave (1751–1821) made a rival claim, but he did not succeed with the practical application of his invention until 1789.
- 1799: The Transit, a type of sailing vessel with a remarkable turn of speed, patented by Richard Hall Gower (1768–1833).
- 1835: The screw propeller invented and patented by Francis Pettit Smith (1808–1874).
- 1843: Launch of the SS Great Britain – the first steam-powered, screw propeller-driven passenger liner with an iron hull; designed by Isambard Kingdom Brunel (1806–1859), it was at the time the largest ship afloat.
- 1876: Plimsoll Line devised by Samuel Plimsoll (1824–1898).
- 1878: First commercially successful closed-circuit scuba designed and built by Henry Fleuss (1851–1932), a pioneer in the field of diving equipment.
- 1878–1879: Two early Victorian submarines, Resurgam I and Resurgam II, designed and built by George Garrett (1852–1902).
- 1894: The first steam turbine powered steamship, Turbinia (easily the fastest ship in the world at the time), designed by Anglo-Irish engineer Sir Charles Algernon Parsons (1854–1931), and built in Newcastle upon Tyne.
- 1899–1901: Developments on the hydrofoil by shipbuilder John Isaac Thornycroft (1843–1928), from the concept of Italian Enrico Forlanini.
- 1912: World's first patent for an underwater echo ranging device (sonar) filed a month after the sinking of the Titanic by Lewis Fry Richardson (1881–1953).
- 1915: Research into solving the practical problems of submarine-detection by sonar led by Ernest Rutherford (1871–1937).
- 1955: The hovercraft invented by Sir Christopher Cockerell (1910–1999).

== Miscellaneous ==
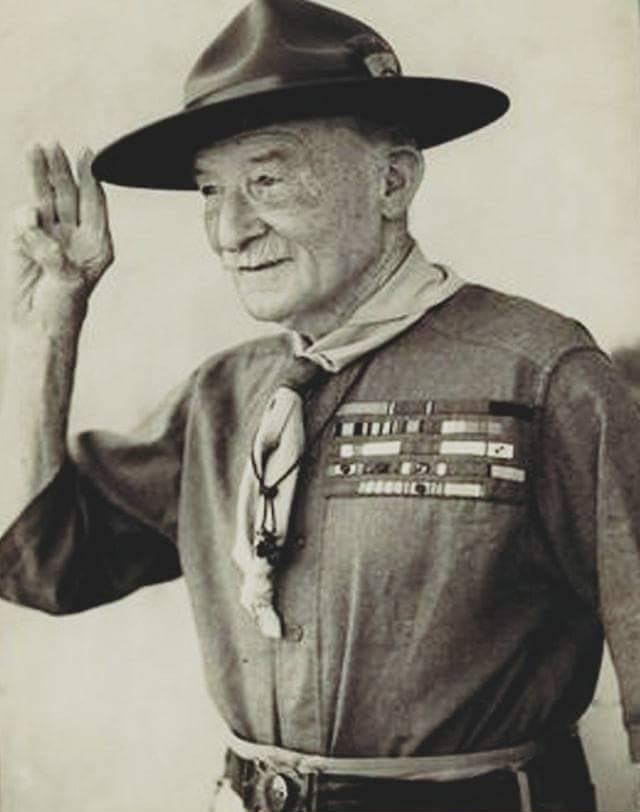
Lord Baden-Powell, invented the scout movement in 1907

- 1286: First recorded use of the Halifax Gibbet, an early guillotine.
- Early 17th century: The closely cut "English" lawn created in the Jacobean epoch of gardening, as the garden and the lawn became places created first as walkways and social areas. The English lawn became a symbol of status of the aristocracy and gentry; it showed that the owner could afford to keep land that was not being used for a building or for food production.
- 1668: Earliest concept of a metric system proposed by John Wilkins (1614–1672) in An Essay towards a Real Character and a Philosophical Language.
- 1706: World's first life insurance company, the Amicable Society, founded by William Talbot (1658–1730) and Sir Thomas Allen, 2nd Baronet (c. 1648–1730).
- 1719: Oldest music-based festival, the Three Choirs Festival, established.
- 1725: The modern kilt, associated since the 19th century with Scottish culture, arguably invented by English Quaker Thomas Rawlinson (dates not known).
- c. 1760: The jigsaw puzzle invented and commercialised by cartographer John Spilsbury (1739–1769).
- 1762: The Sandwich invented by John Montagu, the 4th Earl of Sandwich (1718–1792)
- 1767: The carbonated soft drink invented by Joseph Priestley (1733–1804).
- 1768–1770: The modern circus invented by Philip Astley (1742–1814) in Astley's Amphitheatre on Westminster Bridge Road in Lambeth.
- c. 1770–1780: The lorgnette (a pair of spectacles with a handle, used to hold them in place) invented by George Adams the Elder (c. 1709–1773) and subsequently illustrated in a work by his son George Adams the Younger, An Essay on Vision, briefly explaining the fabric of the eye (1789).
- 1772: Oldest arts festival established in Norwich 1772.
- 1787: First glee club founded in Harrow School.
- 1797: The top hat arguably invented by English haberdasher John Hetherington (dates not known).

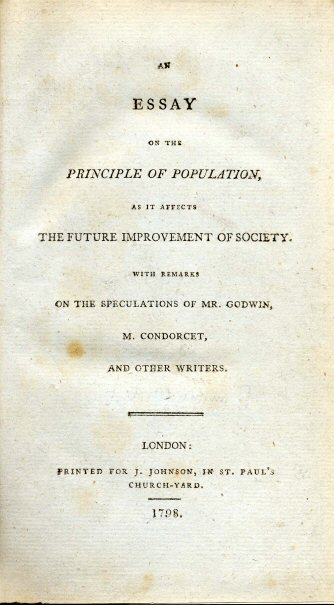
Malthus's Essay on the Principle of Population, 1798

- 1798: Consequences of population growth identified by Thomas Robert Malthus (1766–1834) in An Essay on the Principle of Population.
- 1798: Oldest police force in continuous operation, the Marine Police Force, formed by English seafarer John Harriott (1745–1817) and Scot Patrick Colquhoun; it merged with the nascentMetropolitan Police Service in 1839.
- 18th century – 19th century: The history of comics developed with innovations by William Hogarth (1697–1764), James Gillray (1756/57–1815), George Cruikshank (1792–1878) and others. The Glasgow Looking Glass (1826), arguably the first comic strip. William Heath was its principal strip illustrator.
- 1811: The graphic telescope, a drawing aid with the power of a telescope, invented by water-colour painter Cornelius Varley (1781–1873).
- 1821: World's first modern nature reserve established by naturalist and explorer Charles Waterton (1782–1965); Waterton was described by David Attenborough as "one of the first people anywhere to recognise not only that the natural world was of great importance but that it needed protection as humanity made more and more demands on it".
- 1824: Rubber balloon invented by Michael Faraday (1791–1867) during experiments with gases.
- 1824: First animal welfare society, the RSPCA, founded by a group of reformers including William Wilberforce.
- 1826: First effective friction match invented by John Walker (1781–1859).
- 1829: Metropolitan Police Force founded by Home Secretary Sir Robert Peel; by 1857 all cities in the UK were obliged to form their own police forces.
- 1837 Egg-free custard by Alfred Bird
- 1840: Stamp collecting initiated by zoologist John Edward Gray (1800–1875); on 1 May 1840, the day the Penny Black first went on sale, Gray bought several with the intent to save them.
- 1844: The Rochdale Society of Equitable Pioneers founded in Lancashire. The Rochdale Principles are the foundation for the co-operative principles on which co-ops around the world operate to this day.
- 1844: YMCA (Young Men's Christian Association) founded in London by Sir George Williams (1821–1905), with the aim of putting Christian values into practice.
- 1846: The Christmas cracker invented by London confectioner Thomas J. Smith by wrapping a bon-bon in a twist of coloured paper, adding a love note, a paper hat and a banger mechanism. This new idea took off and the bon-bon was eventually replaced by a small toy or novelty.
- 1849: Bowler hat designed by London hat-makers Thomas and William Bowler.
- 1851: Prime meridian established at Greenwich by Sir George Biddell Airy (1801–1892), Astronomer Royal from 1835 to 1881; Airy's line, the fourth Greenwich Meridian, became the definitive, internationally recognised line in 1884.

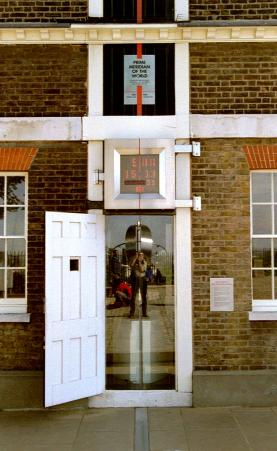
Prime meridian, established at Greenwich, 1851

- 1851: Revolutionary modular, prefabricated design, and use of glass utilised in the building of the Crystal Palace of the Great Exhibition by Joseph Paxton (1803–1865); after the exhibition, the Crystal Palace was moved to Sydenham where it was destroyed in a fire in 1936.
- 1851: Steel-ribbed umbrella developed by Samuel Fox (1815–1887).
- 1860: Linoleum invented by Frederick Walton (1834–1928).
- 1865: The Salvation Army, a Christian denominational church and international charitable organisation, founded by Methodist minister William Booth (1829–1912).
- 1866: The introduction, planting, cultivation and manufacturing of Ceylon tea in the British Crown colony of Ceylon, now Sri Lanka. Sir Arthur Conan Doyle said of the planting efforts "the tea fields of Ceylon were as true a monument to courage as the lions of Waterloo" and called it "one of the greatest commercial victories which pluck and ingenuity ever won."
- 1868: Erection of first mounted dinosaur skeleton, Hadrosaurus Foulkii and introduction of the universal standard for all future dinosaur displays by English artist Benjamin Waterhouse Hawkins in concert with Dr Joseph Leidy and Edward Drinker Cope. Displayed at The Academy of Natural Sciences
- 1870s: One precursor (among others) of the modern gas mask constructed by physicist John Tyndall (1820–1893).
- 1897: Plasticine invented by art teacher William Harbutt (1844–1921).
- 1901: Model construction system Meccano invented by Frank Hornby (1863–1936).
- 1902: First large-scale programme of international scholarships, the Rhodes Scholarship, created by Cecil John Rhodes (1853–1902).
- 1905: Secret identity trope in fiction, from the novel The Scarlet Pimpernel by Baroness Orczy.
- 1907: The scout movement created by Lord Baden-Powell (1857–1941), on finding that his 1899 military training manual Aids to Scouting was being used by teachers and youth organisations.
- 1908: The reserve forest which would become the Kaziranga National Park founded by Lord Curzon of Kedleston to protect the dwindling species of rhinoceros.
- 1913: The crossword puzzle invented by Liverpool-born Arthur Wynne (1871–1945).
- 1922: Discovery of Tutankhamun's tomb by Archaeologist and Egyptologist Howard Carter, funded by Lord Carnarvon.
- 1933: Bayko – a plastic building model construction toy, and one of the earliest plastic toys to be marketed – invented by Charles Plimpton (1893–1948).
- 1946: Toy building bricks invented and patented (under the name "Kiddicraft") by Hilary (Harry) Fisher Page (1904–1957); The Lego Group acquired Page's patent in 1981.
- 1949: Oldest literary festival, the Cheltenham Literature Festival, established.
- 1965: Geometric drawing toy Spirograph developed by Denys Fisher (1918–2002).
- 1982: Guy Fawkes mask designed by David Lloyd.

== See also ==
- List of British innovations and discoveries
- List of Welsh inventors
- List of Scottish inventions and discoveries
- Timeline of Irish inventions and discoveries
- Science in Medieval Western Europe
