= LEO (computer) =

1951 British computer

LEO I
- Logo of LEO Computers Ltd 1954 until 1963
- Also known as: Lyons Electronic Office I
- Manufacturer: J. Lyons and Co.
- Generation: 1
- Released: 1951; 75 years ago
- CPU: @ 500 kHz
- Memory: 2K (2048) 35-bit words (i.e., 8 3/4 kilobytes) (ultrasonic delay-line memory based on tanks of mercury)
- Removable storage: paper tape readers and punches, fast punched card readers and punches, and a 100 line a minute tabulator
- Predecessor: EDSAC
- Successor: LEO II

The LEO (Lyons Electronic Office) was a series of early computer systems created by J. Lyons and Co. The first in the series, the LEO I, was the first computer used for commercial business applications.

The prototype LEO I was modelled closely on the Cambridge EDSAC. Its construction was overseen by Oliver Standingford, Raymond Thompson and David Caminer of J. Lyons and Co. LEO I ran its first business application in 1951. In 1954 Lyons formed LEO Computers Ltd to market LEO I and its successors LEO II and LEO III to other companies. LEO Computers eventually became part of English Electric Company (EEL), (EELM), then English Electric Computers (EEC), where the same team developed the faster LEO 360 and even faster LEO 326 models. It then passed to International Computers Limited (ICL) and ultimately Fujitsu.

LEO series computers were still in use until 1981.

== Origins and initial design ==
J. Lyons and Co. was one of the UK's leading catering and food manufacturing companies in the first half of the 20th century. In 1947, two of its senior managers, Oliver Standingford and Raymond Thompson, were sent to the United States to look at new business methods developed during World War II. During the visit, they met Herman Goldstine who was one of the original developers of ENIAC, the first general-purpose electronic computer. Standingford and Thompson saw the potential of computers to help solve the problem of administering a major business enterprise. They also learned from Goldstine that, back in the UK, Douglas Hartree and Maurice Wilkes were actually building another such machine, the pioneering EDSAC computer, at the University of Cambridge.

On their return to the UK, Standingford and Thompson visited Hartree and Wilkes in Cambridge and were favourably impressed with their technical expertise and vision. Hartree and Wilkes estimated that EDSAC was 12–18 months from completion, but said that this interval could be shortened by additional funding. Standingford and Thompson wrote a report to the Lyons' board recommending that Lyons should acquire or build a computer to meet their business needs. The board agreed that, as a first step, Lyons would provide Hartree and Wilkes with £2,500 for the EDSAC project, and would also provide them with the services of a Lyons electrical engineer, Ernest Lenaerts. EDSAC was completed and ran its first program in May 1949.

Following the successful completion of EDSAC, the Lyons board agreed to start the construction of their own machine, expanding on the EDSAC design. The LEO computer room, which took up around 2,500 square feet of floor space, was at Cadby Hall in Hammersmith.

The Lyons machine was christened Lyons Electronic Office, or LEO. On the recommendation of Wilkes, Lyons recruited John Pinkerton, a radar engineer and research student at Cambridge, as team leader for the project. Lenaerts returned to Lyons to work on the project, and Wilkes provided training for Lyons' engineer Derek Hemy, who would be responsible for writing LEO's programs. On 15 February 1951 the computer, carrying out a simple test program, was shown to HRH Princess Elizabeth. The first business application to be run on LEO was Bakery Valuations, which computed the costs of ingredients used in bread and cakes. This was successfully run on 5 September 1951, and LEO took over Bakery Valuations calculations completely on 29–30 November 1951.

Mary Coombs was employed in 1952 as the first female programmer to work on LEO, and as such she is recognized as the first female commercial programmer.

Five files of archive material on the LEO Computer patent are held at the British Library and can be accessed through the British Library Archives catalogue.

== Design ==
LEO I's clock speed was 500 kHz, with most instructions taking about 1.5 ms to execute. To be useful for business applications, the computer had to be able to handle a number of data streams, input and output, simultaneously. Therefore, its chief designer, John Pinkerton, designed the machine to have multiple input/output buffers. In the first instance, these were linked to fast paper tape readers and punches, fast punched card readers and punches, and a 100-line-per-minute tabulator. Later, other devices, including magnetic tape, were added. Its ultrasonic delay-line memory based on tanks of mercury, with 2K (2048) 35-bit words (i.e., 8 3/4 kilobytes), was four times as large as that of EDSAC. The systems analysis was carried out by David Caminer.

== Applications and successors ==
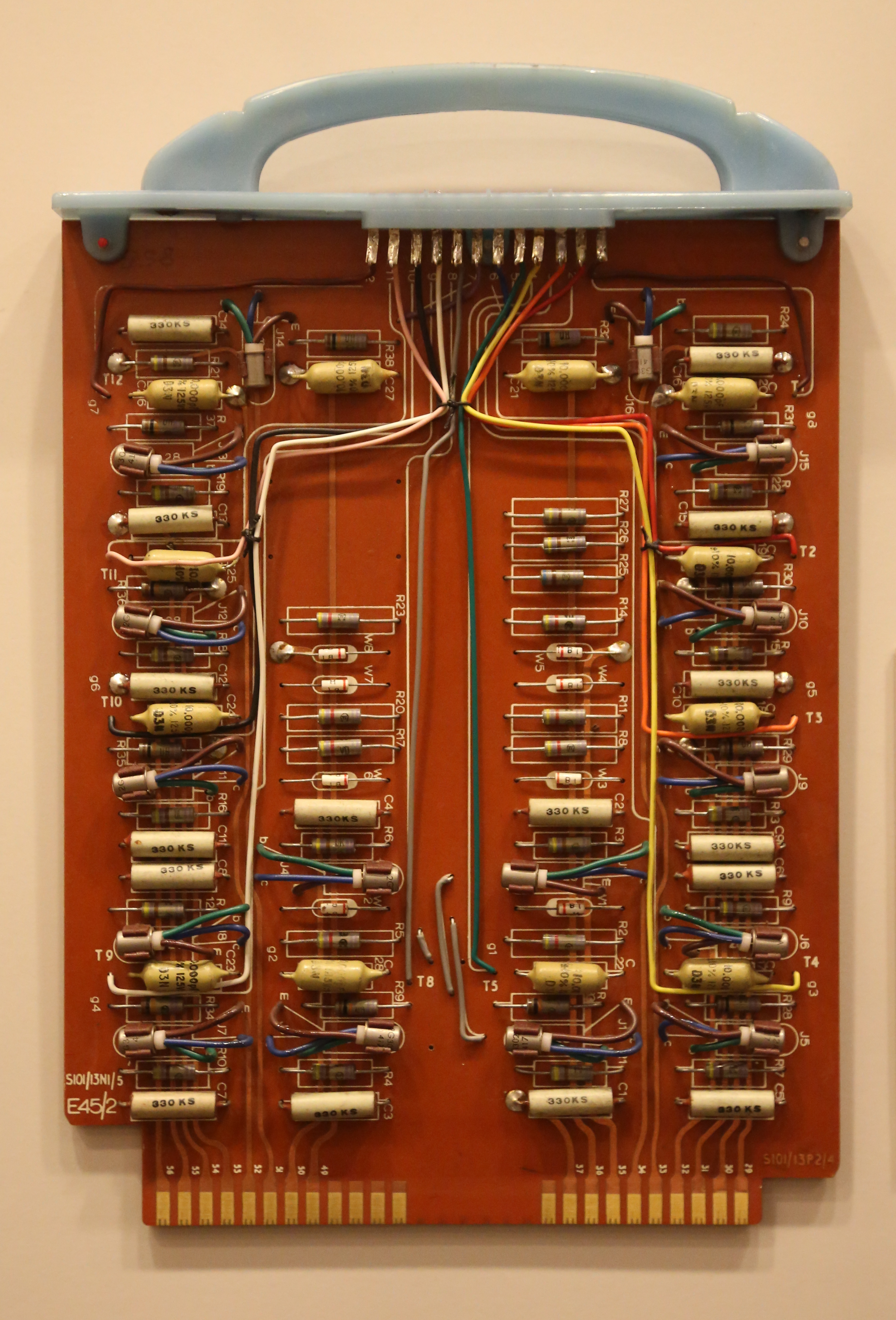
A circuit board from a LEO III computer

Lyons used LEO I initially for valuation jobs, but its role was extended to include payroll, inventory, and so on. One of its early tasks was the elaboration of daily orders, which were phoned in every afternoon by the shops and used to calculate the overnight production requirements, assembly instructions, delivery schedules, invoices, costings, and management reports. This was the first instance of an integrated management information system. The LEO project was also a pioneer in outsourcing: in 1956, Lyons started doing the payroll calculations for Ford UK and others on the LEO I machine. The success of this led to the company dedicating one of its LEO II machines to bureau services. Later, the system was used for scientific computations as well. Met Office staff used a LEO I before the Met Office bought its own computer, a Ferranti Mercury, in 1959.

In 1954, with the decision to proceed with LEO II and interest from other commercial companies, Lyons formed LEO Computers Ltd.

The first LEO III was completed in 1961; it was a solid-state machine with a 13.2 μs cycle time ferrite core memory. It was microprogrammed and was controlled by a multitasking "Master program" operating system, which allowed concurrent running of as many as 12 application programs.

Users of LEO computers programmed in two coding languages: Intercode, a low-level assembler type language; and CLEO (acronym: Clear Language for Expressing Orders), the COBOL equivalent.

One of the features that LEO III shared with many computers of the day was a loudspeaker connected to the central processor via a divide-by-100 circuit and an amplifier which enabled operators to tell whether a program was looping by the distinctive sound it made. Another quirk was that many intermittent faults were due to faulty connectors and could be temporarily fixed by briskly strumming the card handles.

Some LEO III machines purchased in the mid-to-late 1960s remained in commercial use at GPO Telephones, the forerunner of British Telecom, until 1981, primarily producing telephone bills. They were kept running using parts from redundant LEOs purchased by the GPO.

== Fate and legacy ==
In 1963, LEO Computers Ltd was merged into English Electric Company and this led to the breaking up of the team that had inspired LEO computers. The company continued to build the LEO III, and went on to build the faster LEO 360 and even faster LEO 326 models, which had been designed by the LEO team before the takeover.

English Electric LEO Computers (EEL) (1963), then English Electric Leo Marconi (EELM) (1964), later English Electric Computers (EEC) (1967), eventually merged with International Computers and Tabulators (ICT) and others to form International Computers Limited (ICL) in 1968. In the 1980s, there were still ICL 2900 mainframes running LEO programs, using an emulator written in ICL 2960 microcode at the Dalkeith development centre. At least one modern emulator has been developed which can run some original LEO III software on a modern server. ICL was bought by Fujitsu in 1990.

Whether its investment in LEO actually benefited J. Lyons is unclear. Nick Pelling notes that before LEO I the company already had a proven, industry-leading system using clerks that gave it "near-real-time management information on more or less all aspects of its business", and that no jobs were lost when the system was computerized. In addition, LEO Computers lost money on many of its sales because of unrealistically low prices.

In 2018, the Centre for Computing History along with LEO Computers Society were awarded funding from the Heritage Lottery Fund for their project aiming to bring together, preserve, archive and digitise a range of LEO Computers artefacts, and documents. The Centre's museum gallery has an area dedicated to LEO, and as of 2021 they are also working on a LEO virtual reality project. In November 2021, to coincide with the 70th anniversary of the first successful full program run on LEO I, the project released a film about the history of LEO, which went on to win Video of the Year in the Association of British Science Writers Awards in July 2022.

== See also ==
- List of vacuum-tube computers
