= John Pinkerton (computer designer) =

British computer designer (1919–1997)

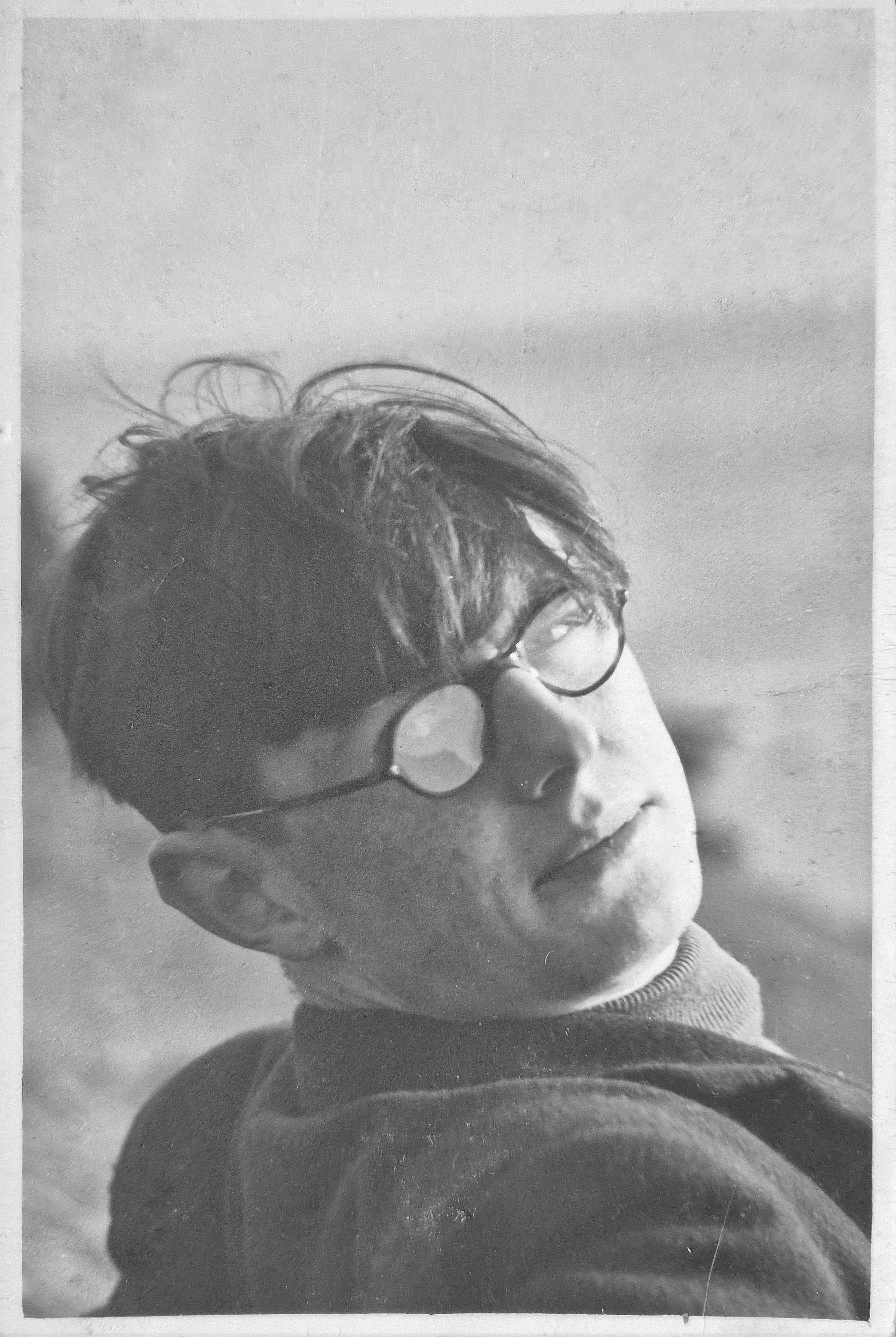
- Citizenship: British
- Scientific career
- Workplaces: Air Ministry Research Establishment; Telecommunications Research Establishment; English Electric Computers; ICL

John Maurice McClean Pinkerton (2 August 1919 – 22 December 1997) was a pioneering British computer designer. Along with David Caminer, he designed England's first business computer, the LEO computer, produced by J. Lyons and Co in 1951.

== Personal life ==
John Pinkerton was educated at King Edward's School, Bath, and Clifton College, Bristol. He studied at Trinity College, Cambridge from 1937 to 1940, reading Natural Sciences, and graduating with first class honours. He joined the Air Ministry Research Establishment in Swanage, to work on radar, and went with it to Malvern where it was renamed the Telecommunications Research Establishment (where he met Maurice Wilkes). He returned to Cambridge as a research student at the Cavendish Laboratory.

In 1948 he married Helen McCorkindale. They had a son and a daughter.

Colleagues describe him as having "a disarming way of listening intently to what others said", a "quiet, dry sense of humour", a "fine, critical, but constructive intelligence", "an enviable ability to handle detail", and "friendliness and kindness". They also mention his knowledge of music and English literature and his lively appreciation of good food.

== J. Lyons ==
The catering firm of J. Lyons was known in the high street for its tea and cakes; in the business world it was known for its innovative approach to supply chain management. As early as 1947 the firm decided that the future lay with computers, and since nothing suitable was available, they resolved to build one. They approached Wilkes in Cambridge, who suggested that they construct a copy of the EDSAC machine, and introduced them to Pinkerton whom they recruited as chief engineer.

Pinkerton's approach was to leave the design unchanged as far as possible, while improving reliability by identifying the points of failure (notably electronic valves) and developing test procedures that enabled component failures to be anticipated and prevented.

The machine went into operation in early 1951, and was used to its full capacity by 1954, at which point the company decided to build a second machine. They also saw the potential in building computers for use by other companies, and in 1955 set up a subsidiary, LEO Computers Ltd, with Pinkerton as technical director. In this capacity he was responsible for the development of the successor machines LEO II and LEO III.

By 1961 it was clear that the company did not have the resources to build its own computers indefinitely, so Lyons sold the operation to English Electric.

== English Electric and ICL ==
Pinkerton was appointed head of research in English Electric Computers, which went through a series of mergers eventually becoming part of ICL in 1968.

In the 1970s Pinkerton, together with Conway Berners-Lee, developed and applied a queuing network model for optimising the price/performance of the new ICL's 'New Range' of computers (later the ICL 2900 Series). It was known as FAST – standing for Football Analogy for System Throughput.

He remained with the company until his retirement in 1984, in a variety of product strategy roles. Maurice Wilkes wrote, "it is a sad fact that, although he remained active in ICL at a senior level, he never found a role that in any way matched his track record or gave full scope for his abilities."

He served for many years as president of ECMA, the European Computer Manufacturers' Association, helping to build it into an organisation respected for the quality and timeliness of its work.

== Retirement ==
In retirement Pinkerton was one of the original court members (from 1988) of the Worshipful Company of Information Technologists and "the mainspring of their Apprenticeship Scheme". He was also editor of a series of technical books.

He edited the ICL Technical Journal between 1990 and 1996. His predecessor, Jack Howlett, commented: "John took the task of editing the journal with great seriousness, energy, and enthusiasm, and spared no effort in ensuring that the papers for each issue... met his exacting standards for content, presentation, and written English. He was very good indeed at discussing the content and form of a possible paper with a potential author, and, with an experienced author, ... helping to sort out the essential ideas and put them in the right logical order." He also frequently intervened with the managers of potential authors to allocate time and recognition for this activity.

He also made contributions to documenting the history of computing, for example through the Science Museum's recorded interviews with UK pioneers.

== Legacy ==
The Institution of Engineering and Technology holds an annual Pinkerton Lecture in their prestigious lecture series. Each year an Engineer of considerable repute is selected to make a computer related presentation. The inaugural lecture was given by Maurice Wilkes.
