= David Caminer =

British computer engineer

- Born: 26 June 1915; London, England
- Died: 19 June 2008 (aged 92)
- Other name: David Treisman
- Occupation: Systems analyst
- Employer: J. Lyons and Co.

David Caminer OBE (26 June 1915 – 19 June 2008) was a British computer engineer who helped to develop the world's first business computer, LEO (Lyons Electronic Office). He has been called "the world's first corporate electronic systems analyst" and "the world's first software engineer". He carried out the systems analysis and charting for the world's first routine business computer job, thus he is also called "the first business application programmer".

== Life and work ==
Caminer was born David Treisman in the East End of London. His father was killed in action during the First World War. When his mother remarried, he was given his stepfather's surname Caminer.

In March 1943 Caminer lost a leg at the Battle of Mareth, whilst serving with the Green Howards in Tunisia.

Caminer worked generally in the area of operations management and cost accounting. He helped to design, along with John Pinkerton, the LEO (Lyons Electronic Office), which has been certified by the Guinness World Records as the world's first business computer.

Caminer joined Lyons & Co. as a management trainee in 1936 and became manager of the Lyons Systems Research Office before concentrating on the computer innovation. He became director of LEO Computers Ltd in 1959 and was subsequently general sales manager of English Electric LEO Marconi, while retaining his responsibility for consultancy and systems implementation. After the merger to form ICL, his posts included the delineation of the systems software requirements for the New Range and director of New Range Market Introduction.

He chose to complete his formal career in the field as project director for the implementation of the computer and communications network for the European Economic Community, where he developed a computer system for the European Common Market. For this work he was appointed to the Order of the British Empire in 1980.

As Caminer himself pointed out, the LEO story highlights important characteristics of the history of innovation in computing technology, including the complex roles of government funding and university research; the frequent failure of technically advanced products to enjoy commercial success; the importance for commercial success in business computing of firm-level capabilities in related technologies; and the interaction between organizational and technological change in the adoption of business computing systems.

In 2001 he presented the second IEE Pinkerton Lecture.

He died in June 2008, at age 92.

== See also ==
- LEO (computer)
- List of pioneers in computer science

== Notes ==
- Caminer, D. T.; Aris, J. B.; Hermon; P. M.; Land, F. F. (1998). LEO: the incredible story of the world's first business computer. McGraw-Hill. ISBN 0-07-009501-9.
- The Journal of Strategic Information Systems, Volume 12, Issue 4, December 2003, Pages 265-284 LEO Conference 2001
- David C. Mowery, 50 Years of business computing: LEO to Linux, The Journal of Strategic Information Systems, Volume 12, Issue 4, December 2003, Pages 295-308
- Ferry, G. (2004). A Computer Called LEO: Lyons Tea Shops and the World's First Office Computer. Hammersmith: Harper Perennial. ISBN 1-84115-186-6.
- Bird, P.J. (1994). LEO: The First Business Computer. Wokingham: Hasler Publishing Co. ISBN 0-9521651-0-4.
