= Harkness Fellowship =

American health care study scholarship

- Awarded for: Study of healthcare practice and policy in the United States for students from abroad
- Sponsored by: The Commonwealth Fund
- Formerly called: The Commonwealth Fellowship
- Established: 1925
- Website: www.commonweathfund.org

The Harkness Fellowship (previously known as the Commonwealth Fund Fellowship) is a program run by the Commonwealth Fund of New York City. This fellowship was established to reciprocate the Rhodes Scholarships and enable Fellows from several countries to spend time studying in the United States.

Recipients of the scholarship include a president of the International Court of Justice; a former chairman and CEO of Salomon Brothers; a former Vice-Chancellor of the University of Cambridge; a controller of BBC Radio 4; an editor of the Sunday Times; former directors of the Medical Research Council, the London School of Economics and the General Medical Council; and a vice president of Microsoft.

== History ==
The Commonwealth Fund is a philanthropic foundation established in the United States by Anna Harkness in 1918. Her son, Edward Stephen Harkness, initiated the Commonwealth Fund Fellowships in 1925. These were intended to reciprocate the Rhodes Scholarships by enabling British graduates to study in the United States. In 1927, the scheme was widened by the creation of Dominion Fellowships available to graduates from universities in Australia, New Zealand, Canada and South Africa. In 1929, a further category of Dominion Civil Service Fellowships was established. The awards were tenable from nine to fifteen months and candidates were to be under the age of 40.

In 1961, the Fellowships were renamed the Harkness Fellowships. In addition to the Civil Service Fellowships, a new category of General Fellowships was set up, open to people in the fields of business, banking, politics, creative arts and journalism. The maximum tenure period was extended to 21 months.

Since June 1997, the activities of the Harkness Fellowships have been limited to the field of health care. The Fellowships are now considered one of the most prestigious award programs in health policy, and accept Fellows from Australia, Canada (known as Harkness Associates), France, Germany, the Netherlands, New Zealand, Norway (as of 2009), Switzerland (as of 2009) and the United Kingdom. They are tenable for twelve months.

== Current fellowship program ==
Harkness Fellows in Health Care Policy & Practice spend a year conducting research at American institutions such as Harvard University, Brigham and Women's Hospital, Columbia University, Stanford University, Johns Hopkins University, Kaiser Permanente, or the Veterans Health Administration. They gain an in-depth understanding of the U.S. health care system and policy challenges, enhance their research skills, and develop contacts and opportunities for ongoing international collaboration.

In addition, Fellows attend a program of seminars during the year:

- September: Orientation and Qualitative Research Methodology Workshop
- November: International Symposium on Healthcare Policy, bringing together Health Ministers from Australia, Canada, France, Germany, the Netherlands, New Zealand, the United Kingdom, and the United States
- February: Washington Policy Briefing held on Capitol Hill with members of the United States Congress and senior government officials
- May: Canadian Policy Briefing on Federal and provincial health
- June: Final Reporting Seminar and the AcademyHealth Annual Research Meeting

== Administration and funding ==
The program is funded and administered by the Commonwealth Fund of New York City, with additional support for some Fellows coming from external bodies, namely:

- B. Braun Stiftung and Robert Bosch Stiftung (Germany)
- Canadian Health Services Research Foundation (Canada)
- Careum Foundation (Switzerland)
- Health Foundation and the National Institute for Health and Care Research (UK)
- The Ministry of Health, Welfare and Sport (Netherlands)

== Notable alumni ==
- Professor David Armitage, transnational historian
- Professor Eric Ashby, Baron Ashby, British botanist and educator
- Professor Peter Atkins, professor of chemistry at the University of Oxford
- Professor Sir Jonathan Bate, Shakespeare scholar and biographer
- Professor Patrick Bateson, emeritus professor of ethology at Cambridge University
- Professor Tim Beaglehole, chancellor of the Victoria University of Wellington
- J.G. Farrell, novelist
- Sir Harrison Birtwistle, composer
- Professor Colin Blakemore, neurobiologist and former chief executive of the Medical Research Council
- Sir Ronald Bottrall, Cornish poet
- Professor Hugh Brogan, historian and biographer
- Sir George Malcolm Brown, geologist
- Professor Sir Roy Calne British surgeon who performed the world's first liver, heart, and lung transplant
- Sir Graeme Catto, president of the General Medical Council
- The Reverend Professor Sarah Coakley, Edward Mallinckrodt Jr. Professor of Divinity at the Harvard Divinity School
- Justin Connolly, composer
- Barry Conyngham, composer, Vice Chancellor of Southern Cross University
- Alistair Cooke, journalist and broadcaster of Letter from America
- Professor Sir Steven Cowley, theoretical physicist and Director of the Princeton Plasma Physics Laboratory
- Dr Nigel H Croft, Quality Expert, and key architect of the ISO quality management standards (ISO 9001)
- Professor Nicholas J. Cull, historian
- Professor Marcus Cunliffe, former visiting professor of American studies at Harvard University
- Mark Damazer, controller of BBC Radio 4 and BBC 7
- Sir Howard Davies, director of the London School of Economics and Political Science
- Sir Peter Maxwell Davies, composer, conductor and Master of the Queen's Music
- Evan Davis, economist, journalist and television presenter
- Professor Glyn Davis, vice-chancellor of the University of Melbourne
- Stuart Devlin, goldsmith and jeweller to Her Majesty the Queen
- Dr Jennifer Dixon, Chief Executive of the Health Foundation
- Professor John Montfort Dunn, emeritus professor of political theory at King's College, Cambridge
- Professor John Dupré, philosopher
- Freeman Dyson, scientist
- Sir Harold Evans, former editor of the Sunday Times
- Sir Terry Farrell, architect of the MI6 Building
- Professor Pamela Gillies, principal and vice-chancellor of Glasgow Caledonian University
- Fiona Godlee, editor of the BMJ
- Lawrence Goldman, historian and editor of the Oxford Dictionary of National Biography
- Anthony Green, painter
- Karl W. Gruenberg, British mathematician
- Nigel Hall, sculptor and draughtsman
- Professor Jonathan Harvey
- Tom Hayhoe, chairman of the Legal Services Consumer Panel and the Taxation Disciplinary Board
- Alastair Hetherington, editor of The Guardian, 1956–1975
- Tony Hey, academic and corporate vice-president of technical computing at Microsoft
- Dame Rosalyn Higgins, president of the International Court of Justice
- Ronald Hilton, British-American academic who helped uncover the CIA's clandestine preparations for the Bay of Pigs invasion
- Professor Masud Husain, neurologist
- Peter Jenkins, journalist
- The Hon. Shane Jones, New Zealand politician
- Professor Ralph Kekwick, biochemist
- Bridget Kendall, diplomatic correspondent for the BBC
- Graeme Koehne, Australian composer and chair of the Australia Council's music board
- Rem Koolhaas, architect and principal of OMA
- Sally Laird, writer, editor and translator
- Professor Nicola LeFanu, composer
- Professor Koen Lenaerts, professor of European Law and judge at the European Court of Justice
- Sue Lenier, English poet and playwright
- Anthony Lester, Baron Lester of Herne Hill, politician
- Michael L'Estrange, Australian public servant and former Australian High Commissioner to the United Kingdom
- Gwyneth Lewis, Welsh poet, the first National Poet for Wales
- Professor David Lodge, British author
- Piers Mackesy, military historian
- Professor Roger Marsh, composer
- Dr Martin Marshall, Chair of the Royal College of General Practitioners (RCGP)
- Sir Deryck Maughan, former chairman and CEO of Salomon Brothers
- Keith Milow, artist
- Julian Mitchell, playwright, screenwriter, novelist
- Jan Morris, historian and travel writer
- Professor Geoff Mulgan, former director of policy at 10 Downing Street and director of the Prime Minister's Strategy Unit
- Baron Murray of Newhaven, British academic
- Sara Nathan, broadcast journalist and regulator
- Julia Neuberger, Baroness Neuberger, rabbi and social reformer
- Peter Nicholls, Australian literary scholar and critic
- Johm Nicolson
- Professor Claus Offe, political sociologist
- Professor Derek Parfit, philosopher
- Baron Penney, physicist responsible for the development of British nuclear technology
- Peter Phillips, artist and pioneer of pop art
- Professor Randolph Quirk, British linguist, former Quain Professor at University College London.
- Professor Dame Anne Marie Rafferty, British nurse, currently Professor of Nursing Policy Florence Nightingale School of Nursing and Midwifery, King's College London and President of the Royal College of Nursing, UK.
- Garry Runciman, 3rd Viscount Runciman of Doxford, British sociologist
- Peter Sands, Group Chief Executive of Standard Chartered plc
- Tim Severin, British explorer
- Malcolm Singer, composer, conductor and Director of Music, Yehudi Menuhin School
- Richard Smith, painter and printmaker
- Randolph Stow, Australian writer
- Andrew Sullivan, writer, blogger and gay rights activist
- Professor Barry Trimmer, biologist and creator of the world's first soft-bodied robot
- Professor Rudolf G. Wagner, sinologist
- Professor Sir David Wallace, director of the Isaac Newton Institute for Mathematical Sciences in Cambridge and master of Churchill College, Cambridge
- Professor Denis Weaire, Irish physicist
- Brett Whiteley, Australian artist
- Professor Sir David Glyndwr Tudor Williams, former Vice-Chancellor of the University of Cambridge
- Professor Jonathan Wolff, former chair of philosophy at University College London.
- Adrian Wooldridge, Washington bureau chief and "Lexington" columnist for The Economist
- Professor Esmond Wright, historian
- Hugo Young, British journalist
- Professor Sir Erik Christopher Zeeman, mathematician
- Ruth Louisa Cohen, economist
- Professor Christina Pagel, Health services researcher and mathematician, Director of the UCL Clinical Operational Research Unit

== See also ==
- Churchill Scholarship
- Fulbright Scholarship
- Gates Cambridge Scholarship
- Rhodes Scholarship
- Marshall Scholarship
- Mitchell Scholarship
- Kennedy Scholarship
