= John Pickard (neurosurgeon) =

British professor emeritus of neurosurgery (born 1946)

- Born: John Douglas Pickard; 21 March 1946 (age 80)
- Awards: Fellow of the Academy of Medical Sciences (1998); Robert H Pudenz Award for Excellence in CSF Physiology (2000); Guthrie Memorial Medal, Royal Army Medical Corps (2010)
- Scientific career
- Workplaces: University of Cambridge; St Catharine's College

John Douglas Pickard CBE FRCS FMedSci (born 21 March 1946) is a British professor emeritus of neurosurgery in the Department of Clinical Neurosciences of University of Cambridge. He is the honorary director of the National Institute for Health Research (NIHR) Healthcare Technology Cooperative (HTC) for brain injury. His research focuses on advancing the care of patients with acute brain injury, hydrocephalus and prolonged disorders of consciousness through functional brain imaging, studies of pathophysiology and new treatments; as well as focusing on health, economic and ethical aspects.

Pickard is an emeritus professorial Fellow of St Catharine's College, Cambridge, having retired as a professorial fellow and director of studies in medical sciences. He served as president of the Society of British Neurological Surgeons from 2006 to 2008.

== Education ==
Pickard attended King George V Grammar School, Southport and then studied Natural Sciences at the University of Cambridge (Bachelor of Arts with First Class Honours in Physiology and Biophysics in 1967). He then completed his Bachelor of Medicine and Surgery at King's College Hospital in London in 1970 and Master of Surgery (MChir with distinction for his thesis on 'The Role of Prostaglandins in the Control of the Cerebral Circulation') from the University of Cambridge in 1981. He is a Fellow of the Royal College of Surgeons of Edinburgh since 1974 and England (Ad eundem) since 1989. Since 1998, Pickard has been a Fellow of the Academy of Medical Sciences.

== Career ==
Pickard trained in neurosurgery at the Institute of Neurological Sciences in Glasgow and at the University of Pennsylvania. He then became an honorary consultant neurosurgeon and senior lecturer, reader and professor of clinical neurology at the Wessex Neurological Centre and University of Southampton. In 1991, he was appointed the first professor of neurosurgery at the University of Cambridge, based at Addenbrooke's Hospital. His clinical practice included, at various times, subspecialty interests in neurovascular surgery, complex necks, hydrocephalus and tumours of the pituitary gland and IIIrd ventricle.

With colleagues, Pickard established and was the first chairman and clinical director of the Wolfson Brain Imaging Centre (WBIC), a division of the University of Cambridge's Department of Clinical Neurosciences, Pickard, in his capacity with the WBIC, worked with patients who were critically ill, the morbidly obese and patients with acute mental health and addiction problems. From 2001 to 2013, Pickard was the National Health Service (NHS) divisional director for neurosciences at Addenbrooke's Hospital. In 2009, Pickard became an NIHR senior investigator. At the end of 2013, Pickard retired from full-time NHS practice and head of academic neurosurgery, but remained active in research as a voluntary director of research in the University of Cambridge.

In 2013, Pickard became the first Cambridge HTC honorary director, which is one of eight national co-operatives that receive funding from the NIHR. The Cambridge HTC is the only HTC to focus on brain injury.

In addition to his presidency of Society of British Neurological Surgeons (SBNS), Pickard was previously chairman of the Joint Neurosciences Council and remains the honorary civilian consultant for neurosurgery to the British Army. Pickard was a member of the UK Government's Animal Procedures Committee and chaired a report into the assessment of cumulative severity and lifetime experience in non-human primates used in neuroscience. This report, also called the Pickard Report, was published in 2013. In addition, Pickard was also president of Academia Eurasiana Neurochirurgica from 2011 to 2012.

Pickard is a patron and former president of Cambridgeshire Headway, a founder-trustee and chairman of the research committee of the Brain and Spine Foundation, a trustee of the Brain Research Trust and was the first patron of Idiopathic Intracranial Hypertension (IIH) UK.

== Research ==
Pickard's research focuses on the care of critically ill patients after brain injury. He led the British Aneurysm Nimodipine trial (BRANT), which demonstrated that nimodipine reduces the incidence of poor outcomes after subarachnoid haemorrhage by 40 per cent. His work has included definition of how early insults to the brain in both childhood and later life may lead to late changes in cognitive outcome and new ways of detecting when the blood supply to critical areas of the brain becomes a risk. Pickard established and chairs the Impaired Consciousness Research Group in Cambridge, which demonstrated that functional neuroimaging could be used to detect awareness in patients who are incapable of generating any recognisable behavioural response and appeared to be in a vegetative state.

Pickard has also studied which parts of the brain are affected in normal pressure hydrocephalus and novel treatments for pseudotumor cerebri and cerebral venous disorders.

With others, Pickard established the Cambridge Shunt Evaluation Laboratory, which provides an international service for shunt testing in-vivo, and the UK Shunt Registry in 1994. The formation of the Registry was funded by the UK Department of Health Medical Devices Agency and contains data on over 70,000 cerebrospinal fluid (CSF) shunt-related procedures.

Pickard has published some 500 publications in scientific and medical journals, including Nature New Biology, the British Medical Journal, Nature, Science, Brain, The Lancet and the New England Journal of Medicine. He has co-authored 6 books, including a monograph on 'Pseudotumor cerebri syndrome'. He was formerly editor-in-chief of the series Advances in Technical Standards in Neurosurgery, editor-in-chief of the British Journal of Neurosurgery (2000–2006) and neurosurgical editor of the Journal of Neurology, Neurosurgery, and Psychiatry. The ISI Web of Science credits him with an h-index of 67.

== Honours and awards ==
In 2000, Pickard received the Robert H. Pudenz Award for excellence in CSF physiology. In 2008, he was awarded the Docteur Honoris Causa from the University of Liège, Belgium. In 2010, Pickard was awarded the Guthrie Memorial Medal of the Royal Army Medical Corps and named as one of Britain's top doctors by The Times. In 2014, he received the Lifetime Achievement Appreciation Award from the International Society for Hydrocephalus and CSF Disorders.

Pickard was appointed Commander of the Order of the British Empire (CBE) in the 2020 New Year Honours for services to neurosciences, neurosurgery and research for patients with complex neurological disorders.
