= The Hardest Word =

The Hardest Word may refer to:

- "The Hardest Word" (Ghosts), a 2022 television episode
- "The Hardest Word" (Waking the Dead), a 2004 television episode

== See also ==
- "Sorry Seems to Be the Hardest Word", a song by Elton John
