= Geoffrey Jefferson =

British neurologist (1886–1961)

Professor Sir Geoffrey Jefferson CBE FRS
- Born: 10 April 1886; Stockton-on-Tees, County Durham, England
- Died: 29 January 1961 (aged 74); Manchester, England
- Spouse: Gertrude May Flumerfelt (m. 1914)
- Children: Michael, Monica, Anthony
- Father: Arthur Jefferson
- Awards: Lister Medal (1948)

Sir Geoffrey Jefferson CBE FRS (10 April 1886 – 29 January 1961) was a British neurologist and pioneering neurosurgeon.

Jefferson was born in Stockton-on-Tees, County Durham, the son of surgeon Arthur John Jefferson (1857–1915), and Cecilia James. He was educated in Manchester, England, obtaining his medical degree in 1909. He became a fellow of the Royal College of Surgeons two years later. He married in 1914, and moved to Canada. On the outbreak of World War I, he returned to Europe and worked at the Anglo-Russian Hospital in Petrograd, Russia, and then with the Royal Army Medical Corps in France.

After the war, he returned to Manchester, working at the Salford Royal Hospital. It was here, in 1925 that Jefferson performed the first successful embolectomy in England. By 1934, he was a neurosurgeon at the Manchester Royal Infirmary, becoming the UK's first professor of neurosurgery at the University of Manchester five years later. The Jefferson fracture, which he was the first to describe, was named after him. Manchester Royal Infirmary also honours Jefferson with the Jefferson Suite, a training area in their Medical Education Campus.

Jefferson was elected to Membership of the Manchester Literary and Philosophical Society on 1 January 1943, and a fellow of the Royal Society in 1947. He was awarded the Lister Medal in 1948 for his contributions to surgical science. The corresponding Lister Oration, given at the Royal College of Surgeons of England, was not delivered until 1949, and was titled 'The Mind of Mechanical Man'. The subject of this lecture was the Manchester Mark 1, one of the earliest electronic computers, and Jefferson's lecture formed part of the early debate over the possibility of artificial intelligence. In 1956 he presented the Sir Hugh Cairns Memorial Lecture at the Society of British Neurological Surgeons.

The University of Manchester Library holds a collection of papers relating to Jefferson, which includes details of his early research and professional correspondence, more details of which can be found here. The University of Manchester also holds a significant collection of Jefferson's patient files, numbering approximately 3,500, which are as yet uncatalogued.

A ward at the Walton Centre is named in his honour.

In April 2021, a partnership between the Manchester Centre for Clinical Neurosciences (part of the Northern Care Alliance NHS Foundation Trust), The University of Manchester and the Manchester Academic Health Science Centre opened a new centre for discovery science and experimental medicine to rapidly translate research into healthcare benefit. The Centre develops new treatments and interventions to improve outcomes and transform the lives of patients with neurological disease and was named Geoffrey Jefferson Brain Research Centre in his honour.

== Sources ==
- So That Was Life: A Biography of Sir Geoffrey Jefferson, Master of the Neurosciences and Man of Letters, Peter H. Schurr, Royal Society of Medicine Press, 1997.

Professional and academic associations
Preceded by Horace Hayhurst	President of the Manchester Literary and Philosophical Society; 1952–54	Succeeded by Sir Peter P. F. R. Venables
