= Refugees at Home =

British charity

Refugees at Home is an independent charity which finds temporary accommodation for refugees and asylum seekers with host families in the UK.

By the middle of 2025 Refugees at Home had arranged hosts for over 6800 refugees and asylum seekers fleeing war and persecution from more than 70 countries, on about 700,000 placement nights (one person in a bed for one night).

== People ==
Refugees at Home was set up in 2015 by Timothy Nathan, Nina Kaye and Sara Nathan as a response to the Syrian Refugee Crisis.

The charity is led by Executive Director Lauren Scott, who was awarded an MBE in 2022 in recognition of her work for refugees. It is chaired by Daniel Gerring, partner at law firm Travers Smith, who provide ongoing support. Its patrons include Lord Alf Dubs and comedian Shappi Khorsandi. It currently has c20 staff, supported by a large number of volunteers.

Refugees at Home relies on its network of qualified volunteer home visitors who assess homes and hosts, and the many British hosts who offer to provide temporary accommodation. There are 12,000 people registered to host through Refugees at Home.

== Work ==
Refugees at Home matches British hosts with a spare room to refugees and asylum seekers in need of somewhere to stay.

The charity uses professionally qualified home visitors to assess potential hosts and to carefully match hosts to guests. It also provides an ongoing link and support in order to give placements the best chance of success.

Refugees at Home works closely with a range of partners such as the British Red Cross, Refugee Council, Refugee Action, Crisis (charity) and NACCOM, who refer guests for hosting.

Since the invasion of Ukraine in 2022, Refugees at Home has been one of the UK government's 'Recognised Providers' helping to find sponsors for refugees under the Homes for Ukraine scheme

== Profile ==
Refugees at Home received widespread media coverage in September 2020 when former English footballer and BBC broadcaster, Gary Lineker, worked with the charity to host a refugee. After being confronted on Twitter about his personal response to the refugee crisis, Mr Lineker responded with a picture of the charity's confirmation that he had signed up to host. Lineker received a letter of thanks from Rasheed, a Pakistani refugee who stayed with him for 20 days, which he said 'made it worthwhile'.

More recently, British actor Benedict Cumberbatch was widely reported for talking about his desire to host Ukrainian refugees through Refugees at Home. His work with the charity was featured in Hello! Magazine’s ‘Kind List’ in November 2022.

British television presenter and Countdown host Rachel Riley has also hosted through Refugees at Home, describing the charity’s work as ‘life-changing’.

Refugees at Home's overall aim is for hosting to be normalised as a way of welcoming those fleeing war and persecution in other countries to the UK.

== See also ==
- Homes for Ukraine
