= King George V College =

King George V Sixth Form College
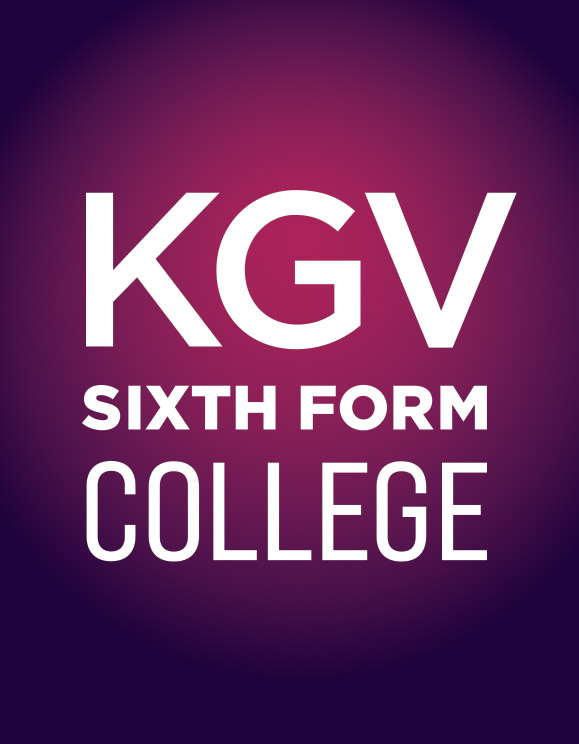

Location
- Scarisbrick New Road; Southport, Merseyside, PR8 6LR; England; 53.636954°N 2.978754°W

Information
- Type: Further education college
- Established: 1926 as a school, 1978 as a college
- Local authority: Sefton
- Department for Education URN: 130492 Tables
- Principal: Michelle Brabner
- Gender: mixed
- Age: 16 to 19
- Enrolment: c. 1200 full time, c. 600 part time
- Publication: The Violet
- Website: http://www.kgv.ac.uk

King George V Sixth Form College (KGV) is a sixth form college in Southport, Merseyside, England. It provides A-level and BTEC education, and between 2009 and 2012 offered the International Baccalaureate Diploma. It was previously a grammar school for boys. The college has the distinction of being placed consistently in the top 10 sixth form and further education colleges in the country for A-level results, and has won a number of Good Schools Guide awards.

King George V College merged with Southport College in January 2018. The combined colleges maintain their separate identities and offer A-level and Vocational education.

== History ==
The college opened in September 1920 as Southport Municipal Secondary School for Boys. New buildings were constructed at the current site on Scarisbrick New Road in 1926, in preparation for a reopening by the Earl of Derby on 16 October of that year, when the institution was rechristened King George V Grammar School. In September 1979 the college assumed its current name; in 1982 its school section ceased to exist.

In October 2014, Ofsted placed KGV — previously a grade 1 'outstanding' college — in the 'inadequate' or grade 4 boundary for education providers. The report cited a lack of effective leadership and severe staff cuts as reasons for its poor findings. In June of the following year, Ofsted upgraded the college's 'inadequate' grade after a second report announced significant improvement. Since 2014 several of the site's buildings have been refurbished, including the sports hall and the humanities building. During this renovation the two-room Classics building, then the longest-standing building on the campus, was demolished.

== Academic structure ==
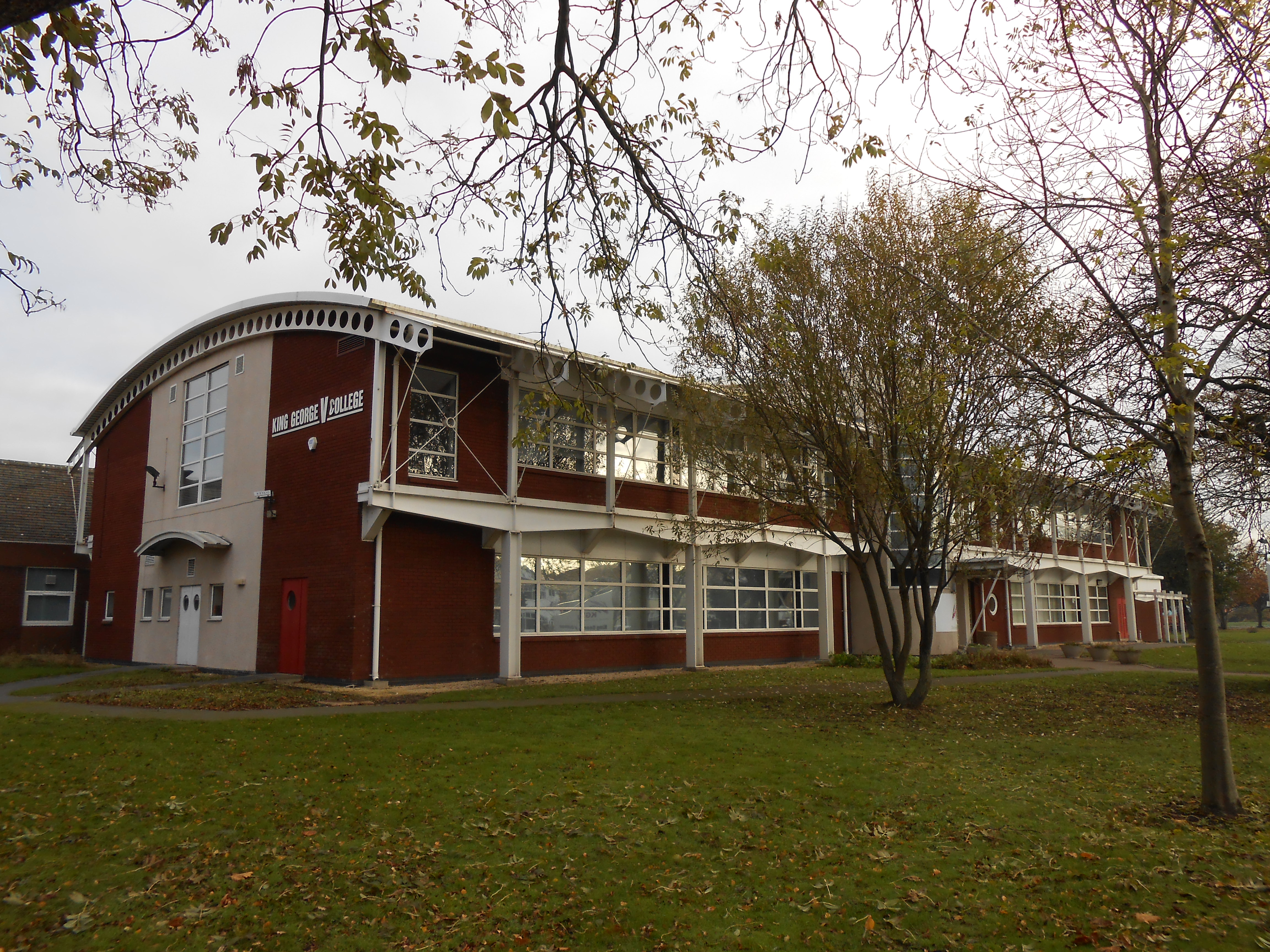
The main college building in 2013.

The college no longer uses the house system established when it also served as a secondary school. It previously opted for five subject specific faculties, namely:

- AE - Arts and English Subjects.
- BI - Business and Information Subjects.
- HL - Humanities and Languages Subjects.
- MS - Maths and Science Subjects.
- SO - Social Science Subjects, including sociology, psychology and the PASE scheme.

== Students' union ==
The college hosts an independent students' union which is a member of the National Union of Students. The student union is run by the Student Council, which meets at least once a month. Student Council members are typically second-year students elected by members of their tutor groups. The council's two co-chairpersons are elected in a college-wide student election, and are members of KGV's governing body as required by the Education Act 1994.

== Notable alumni ==
=== King George V College ===
- Sarah Barrand, actress.
- Simon Howard, public health physician.
- Sophie Howard, glamour model.
- Joanne Nicholas, Badminton player.
- Stacey Roca, actress.
- Tom Gray, musician and activist

=== King George V Grammar School ===
- Marc Almond of Soft Cell.
- John Culshaw, classical record producer and Head of Music Programmes at the BBC from 1967 to 1975.
- Arthur Davidson, Member of Parliament for Accrington from 1966 to 1983.
- Peter Dodworth, Station Commander of RAF Wittering from 1983 to 1985.
- Michael English, Member of Parliament for Nottingham West from 1964 to 1983.
- Ronnie Fearn, Baron Fearn, Member of Parliament for Southport from 1987 to 1992 and 1997–2001.
- Frank Hampson, artist and creator of Dan Dare.
- Michael Weston King, singer.
- David Lonsdale, actor.
- Michael Meadowcroft, Member of Parliament for Leeds West from 1983 to 1987.
- John Pickard, professor emeritus of neurosurgery at the University of Cambridge.
- Peter Garwood (1931–2020), member of staff 1966–1974, later HM Inspector of Schools
