= Waking the Dead (TV series) =

BBC television series

- Genre: Crime drama
- Created by: Barbara Machin
- Starring: Trevor Eve; Sue Johnston; Wil Johnson; Claire Goose; Holly Aird; Esther Hall; Félicité Du Jeu; Tara Fitzgerald; Stacey Roca; Eva Birthistle
- Composer: Joe Campbell
- Country of origin: United Kingdom
- Original language: English
- No. of series: 9
- No. of episodes: 92 (list of episodes)

Production
- Executive producers: Alexei de Keyser; Patrick Spence; Susan Hogg; Anne Pivcevic
- Producer: Colin Wratten
- Cinematography: Mike Spragg
- Editor: Adam Trotman
- Running time: 60 minutes
- Production company: BBC Drama Group

Original release
- Network: BBC One
- Release: 4 September 2000 – 11 April 2011

Related
- The Body Farm

Waking the Dead is a British television police procedural crime drama series, produced by the BBC, that centres on a fictional London-based cold-case unit composed of CID police officers, a psychological profiler, and a forensic scientist. A pilot episode aired in September 2000, and a total of nine series followed. Each story is split into two hour-long episodes, shown on consecutive nights on BBC One. A third-series episode won an International Emmy Award in 2004. The programme was also shown on BBC America in the United States, though these screenings are edited to allow for advertising breaks, as well as UKTV in Australia and New Zealand and ABC1 in Australia. A total of 46 stories aired across the nine series. The show aired its final episode on 11 April 2011.

Following Waking the Dead's conclusion, a spin-off series, titled The Body Farm, aired in late 2011, revolving around forensic scientist Eve Lockhart (Tara Fitzgerald). It was cancelled after one series.

In 2018, a five-part radio prequel to Waking the Dead, entitled The Unforgiven, was broadcast on BBC Radio 4, with all five episodes written by series creator Barbara Machin. Sue Johnston, Claire Goose, Wil Johnson, and Holly Aird all reprised their roles, with Anthony Howell replacing Trevor Eve in the role of Peter Boyd.

== Plot ==
=== Overview ===
The programme follows the work of a special police team that investigates cold cases, which usually concern murders that took place a number of years in the past, and were never solved. The team, composed of head officer Detective Superintendent Peter Boyd (Trevor Eve), psychological profiler Grace Foley (Sue Johnston), and Detective Inspector Spencer Jordan (Wil Johnson), as well as a number of other supporting characters, uses evidence which has recently come to light, as well as contemporary technology to examine former evidence.

Initially, Boyd, Grace, and Spence were accompanied by junior DC Mel Silver (Claire Goose), and stern forensic scientist Frankie Wharton (Holly Aird), but both left after the end of the fourth series. Felix Gibson (Esther Hall) and Stella Goodman (Félicité du Jeu) replaced them in the fifth series, before Eve Lockhart (Tara Fitzgerald) replaced Felix from the sixth series onwards. Katarina Howard (Stacey Roca) replaced Stella in series eight, while Sarah Cavendish (Eva Birthistle) replaced Katarina in series nine. Although the plotlines generally centre around the case, other storylines have been incorporated across the years, including Boyd's anger-management issues and his being reunited with his son, Grace suffering from cancer, Spencer being shot at the hands of one of his former colleagues, and Mel's death, which creates a chain of events lasting across two series.

The show also addressed sensitive issues such as fanaticism within different religions, international organised crime, child abuse within the Catholic church, war crimes in Bosnia, forced child labour, torture, homophobia, and racism. The BBC issued disclaimers twice on the show when it touched upon issues sensitive to the Labour government of the time (once about banking frauds within the City of London establishment and once about the involvement of the UK in the Iraq war). Some of the issues were dealt with through the conflicting views of Peter Boyd (a white middle-class liberal) and Spencer Jordan (a black working-class conservative).

== Cast ==
=== Main cast ===
- Trevor Eve as Det. Supt. Peter Boyd
- Sue Johnston as Grace Foley
- Wil Johnson as DS/DI Spencer Jordan
- Claire Goose as DC/DS Amelia Silver (Series 1–4)
- Holly Aird as Frankie Wharton (Series 1–4)
- Esther Hall as Felix Gibson (Series 5)
- Félicité du Jeu as DC Stella Goodman (Series 5–8)
- Tara Fitzgerald as Eve Lockhart (Series 6–9)
- Stacey Roca as DS Katrina Howard (Series 8)
- Eva Birthistle as Det. Supt. Sarah Cavendish (Series 9)

=== Recurring cast ===
- Simon Kunz as DAC Ralph Christie (Series 1)
- George Rainsford as Luke Boyd (Series 7–9)
- Ruth Gemmell as Linda Cummings (Series 7–8)
- Elizabeth Rider as DCC Maureen Smith (Series 8–9)

== Characters ==
=== Police ===
- Detective Superintendent Peter Boyd is the head of the unit. His involvement in the unit stemmed from the disappearance of his son in the 1990s. Though sometimes appearing detached, Boyd is especially close to his team, and particularly, Mel Silver, whose death haunts him after he is unable to come to terms with it. Boyd's son Luke (called Joe in series 1), is a drug-dependent runaway who disappeared whilst living on the streets, and dies from an overdose in season 7. As a detective superintendent, Boyd is often brash, sarcastic and stern with suspects, and is unafraid to give them a beating. Boyd appeared in every episode.
- Detective Sergeant Spencer Jordan was one of the original officers assigned to the unit when it opened, and soon became Boyd's main sidekick, often joining him in "good-cop-bad-cop" routines in the interview room, and leading the other officers within the team. He was promoted to detective inspector at the start of the fourth series, having initially joined as a detective sergeant. Before joining the unit, Spencer worked for the Atomic Energy Constabulary. Spencer reveals his intention to transfer out of the unit in "End of the Night", but in "Endgame", liaises with the unit during his stint in CID, in order to help Boyd track down Linda Cummings.
- Detective Constable Amelia "Mel" Silver was a feisty, young achiever who worked hard to be promoted from her initial role as constable to sergeant, and who frequently questioned Boyd if she believed he was looking in the wrong direction on a case. She was especially close to Frankie, and the pair became good friends. It is revealed in the episode Fugue State, that Mel was adopted, as her birth mother was deemed mentally unfit, and that her real name is Mary Price. Mel was killed by a deranged suspect in the fourth series finale. Boyd was unable to accept her death until the sixth series, which involves a case she investigated before her death.
- Detective Constable Stella Goodman joined the unit as a permanent replacement for Detective Sergeant Silver, after being interviewed by Boyd and Grace at the start of series five. Boyd was initially hostile towards her, after being unable to accept Mel's death, but eventually came to accept her. Boyd's trust in Stella was betrayed at the end of series five, when it was revealed she had unwittingly sent information on the unit to her godfather, who had been manipulating her to cover up his own corruption. Stella died at the start of series eight, after being shot in the leg by a suspect she was chasing, and suffering thrombosis as a result of the injury.
- Detective Sergeant Katrina Howard appears at the start of the eighth series as a police constable, formerly a member of the Serious Organised Crime Agency, with a history of insubordination. However, she is transferred into the unit at Boyd's request following the death of DC Goodman after being impressed by her feisty personality. Following the temporary departure of Spencer Jordan, Howard has a much more active role to play within the team than her predecessor, as she is the only other active officer aside from Boyd. Howard did not return for the ninth series, as actress Roca decided to leave the show after just one series. Her on-screen departure was never explained.
- Detective Superintendent Sarah Cavendish was transferred into the unit at the start of series nine, to replace Detective Sergeant Howard, having been moved from counter-terrorism after an incident which led to her becoming the scapegoat. She was one of the youngest superintendents in the history of the Met and, until the incident, a high flyer. At the end of the ninth series, she is murdered by Assistant Chief Commissioner Tony Nicholson, due to her knowledge of his crimes, and by spying on his interactions at The Emirates Stadium with one of the antagonists. Her body was planted in Boyd's shed by Nicholson in an attempt to frame him for her murder.

=== Doctors ===
- Grace Foley is a psychological profiler, with nearly thirty years' experience in the field. Her presence in the unit provides a rational counter to Boyd's somewhat unorthodox methods, but the pair enjoy a close working relationship and often engage in witty banter. Grace is often able to build a mental profile of the suspect or suspects, allowing Boyd to discover the meaning behind a particular crime or crimes they may have committed. Grace also had a short bout with stomach cancer, which forced her to take time out from the unit to have an operation, from which she fully recovered. Johnston stayed with the programme until its end.
- Frankie Wharton, the unit's first forensic pathologist, took a conscientious approach to her job, but remained stern with her colleagues. Frankie was unafraid to speak her mind, and often offered strong insight into who or what was responsible for the crime. She was good friends with Mel Silver, and it was referenced that she and Mel knew each other before working in the unit. However, traumatised by Mel's death, Frankie chose to leave the unit to return to research, a fact which was explained in the first episode of series five. The real reason for Frankie's departure stemmed from actress Holly Aird's pregnancy.
- Felix Gibson took over as the unit's forensic pathologist after Frankie's departure. Felix had already been with the team for some time at the start of series five, and her introduction following Frankie's departure was never explained on screen. Like her predecessor, she would often leave the office to join her colleagues in the field, but took a less stern role within the team, instead offering the knowledge in a more succinct and insightful way. However, she would not hesitate to stand up to Boyd when necessary. The reason behind Felix's departure was never explained on screen, and actress Esther Hall gave no reason for her decision to leave the show.
- Eve Lockhart took over as the unit's forensic pathologist after Felix's departure, and her first case is shown at the start of series six, with hints that she has in fact already worked with the team for some time. Unlike her predecessors, Eve practices pathology outside of her time in the unit, and even has her own body farm, which allows her to understand the stages of decomposition in different circumstances, from the time of death until as long as five years later. Eve plays a less demanding role in the team than both Frankie and Felix, and instead acts as more of a leader, attracting the team to new cases. Eve also smokes, often in the laboratory, unlike Frankie and Felix. Fitzgerald stayed with the show until its end and went on to revive the character in the spin-off series The Body Farm.

== Reception ==
The first series secured strong ratings, with "Burn Out" receiving 8.4 million viewers and a 38% audience share. Persistently high ratings meant the programme was recommissioned each year for either the summer or winter schedule. The sixth series began with strong ratings, with "Wren Boys" achieving 9.2M viewers and a 35.2% audience share. The second part dropped to 8.6M, but still gained a 33% audience share. Following the successful transmission of the third series and an International Emmy Award nomination for "Special Relationship" written by Stephen Davis and directed by David Thacker, a further two series were commissioned with the number of stories expanded from four to six. Waking the Dead won an International Emmy Award the following year for "Breaking Glass", written by Stephen Davis and directed by Maurice Phillips, and "Multistorey", written by Ed Whitmore and directed by Bob Bierman.

== Home media ==
All nine series have been released on DVD in the United Kingdom via 2 Entertain Ltd, under the BBC DVD banner. All nine series are also available in a complete boxset. Series one to seven have been released by BBC Video in the United States, while all nine series have been released in Australia via Roadshow.

DVD name	Release dates		
DVD name	Region 1	Region 2	Region 4
Series One	24 October 2006	12 September 2005	2 March 2006
Series Two	16 October 2007	26 June 2006	1 April 2010
Series Three	20 January 2009	25 September 2006	1 June 2010
Series Four	19 January 2010	29 January 2007	4 August 2010
Series Five	18 January 2011	10 September 2007	5 October 2010
Series Six	17 January 2012	19 May 2008	2 December 2010
Series Seven	15 January 2013	3 May 2010	3 February 2011
Series Eight	17 September 2013	12 July 2010	3 May 2011
Series Nine	20 May 2014	2 May 2011	3 June 2012
Series One-Nine	—N/a	2 May 2011	—N/a

== See also ==
- The Enigma Files, UK / BBC Two, 1980
- Cold Squad, CAN / CTV, 1998
- Cold Case Files, USA / A&E, 1999 (true cases)
- New Tricks, UK / BBC One, 2003
- Cold Case, USA / CBS, 2003
- Solved, USA / ID, 2008 (true cases)
- Zettai Reido, Japan / Fuji Television, 2010
- Cold Justice, USA / TNT, 2013 (true cases)
- To Catch a Killer, CAN / OWN, 2014 (true cases)
- Signal, South Korea / tvN, 2016
- Signal, Japan / Fuji TV, 2018
- Silent Witness, UK BBC One, 1996
