= Rosalind Louise Smyth =

British pediatrician

- Born: 28 September 1958 (age 67); Belfast, Northern Ireland
- Education: Clare College, Cambridge; Westminster Medical School; University of London

Rosalind Louise Smyth CBE (born 28 September 1958) is a British paediatrician from Northern Ireland. She is professor of child health at University College London, and was the director of the UCL Great Ormond Street Institute of Child Health from 2012 until 2022. She has been vice dean for research in the UCL Faculty of Population Health Sciences since 2022.

== Early life ==
She was born in Belfast, Northern Ireland and attended Down High School. She went on to study at Clare College, Cambridge (BA 1980; MA 1984), and Westminster Medical School, University of London (MB BS 1983).

== Career ==
She trained in paediatrics in London, Cambridge (MD 1993) and Liverpool. Until September 2012, she was professor of paediatric medicine at the University of Liverpool and executive director of Liverpool Health Partners. From 2005 to 2012 she was director of the National Institute for Health Research (NIHR) Medicines for Children Research Network, which supported all clinical research with children in England. She is a fellow and former council member of the Academy of Medical Sciences. She was a clinical medicine sub-panel member of the 2008 Research Assessment Exercise and the 2014 Research Evaluation Framework and numerous grant awarding bodies. She was a member of the Medicines and Healthcare products Regulatory Agency's Commission on Human Medicines (2009–2013) and chaired its Paediatric Medicines Expert Advisory Group (2002–13).

She was appointed a CBE in the Queen's New Year's Honours list in 2015 for services to the regulation of drugs for children. She has a commitment to open access publishing and was a director of the Public Library of Science 2006–2016. She is a governor and trustee of the Health Foundation (2016), trustee of the Medical Research Foundation and the Lister Institute of Preventive Medicine. She was chair of the MRC's Clinical Training and Career Development Panel from 2017 until 2022 and is chair of the MRC's Training and Careers Group. In November 2023, she became vice president (clinical) of the Academy of Medical Sciences.

== Honours ==
Fellow of the Academy of Medical Sciences (2006); NIHR senior investigator (2008), honorary fellow of the Faculty of Pharmaceutical Medicine (2010), fellow of the European Respiratory Society (2014), Commander of the Order of the British Empire (CBE) for services to the regulation of medicines for children (2015), member of the Academia Europaea (2018)

== Selected publications ==
- Taylor-Robinson DC, Whitehead M, Diggle PJ, Smyth RL. The effect of social deprivation on clinical outcomes and the use of treatments in the UK cystic fibrosis population: a longitudinal study. Lancet Respiratory Medicine. 2013; 1(2) 121–128.
- Everitt AR, Clare S, Pertel T, John SP, Wash RS, Smith SE, Chin CR, Feeley EM, Sims JS, Adams DJ, Wise HM, Kane L, Goulding DA, Digard P, Anttila V, Baillie JK, Walsh TS, Hume DA, Palotie A, Xue Y, Colonna V, Tyler-Smyth C, Dunning J, Gordon S, The GenISIS, The MOSAIC Investigators, Smyth RL, Openshaw P, Dougan G, Brass AL, Kellam P. IFITM3 restricts the morbidity and mortality associated with influenza. Nature 2012; 484: 519–523.
- Halfhide CP, Flanagan BF, Brearey SP, Hunt JA, Fonceca AM, McNamara PS, Howarth D, Edwards S, Smyth RL. Respiratory Syncytial Virus binds and undergoes transcription in neutrophils in the blood and airways of infants with severe bronchiolitis. J. Infect Dis 2011; 204: 451–458.
- Gladstone M, Lancaster GA, Umar E, Nyirenda M, Kayira E, van den Broek N, Smyth RL. The Malawi Developmental Assessment Tool (MDAT): A validated and reliable tool for assessment of child development in rural African settings. PLoS Med 2010; 7(5): e1000273.
- McNamara PS, Flanagan BF, Baldwin LM, Newland P, Hart CA, Smyth RL. Interleukin-9 production in the lungs of infants with severe respiratory syncytial virus bronchiolitis. Lancet 2004; 363(9414): 1031 – 1037.
- Craig JV, Lancaster GA, Taylor S, Williamson PR, Smyth RL. Infrared ear thermometry compared with rectal thermometry in children: a systematic review. Lancet 2002; 360: 603–609.
- Craig JV, Lancaster GA, Williamson PR, Smyth RL. Temperature measured at the axilla compared with rectum in children and young people: systematic review. BMJ 2000 Apr; 320(7243):1174–1178.
- Cheng K, Smyth RL, Govan JRW, Doherty C, Winstanley C, Denning N, Heaf DP, van Saene H, Hart CA. Spread of β-lactam-resistant Pseudomonas aeruginosa in a cystic fibrosis clinic. Lancet 1996; 346: 639–642.
- Smyth RL, Ashby D, O’Hea U, Burrows E, Lewis PA, van Velzen D, Dodge JA. Fibrosing colonopathy in cystic fibrosis: results of a case-control study. Lancet 1995 346: 1247–1251.
- Smyth RL, Scott JP, Borysiewicz LK, Sharples L, Stewart S, Wreghitt TG, Gray JJ, Higenbottam TW, Wallwork J. Cytomegalovirus infection in heart lung transplant recipients: risk factors, clinical associations and response to treatment. J Infect Dis 1991; 164: 1045–1050.
