= Animal Procedures Committee =

The Animal Procedures Committee advised the British Home Secretary on matters related to animal testing in the UK. The function of the committee was made a statutory requirement by the Animals (Scientific Procedures) Act 1986 (the ASPA), which mandated that it should have at least 12 members, excluding the chair. The APC no longer exists as the ASPA has been revised in accordance with EU legislation. It was disbanded on 31 December 2012 and was replaced by the Animals in Science Committee in 2013.

== Composition of members ==
The Act stipulated that at least two-thirds of the members had full registration as medical practitioners or veterinary surgeons, or that they be qualified in a relevant biological subject; that one member be a barrister, solicitor, or advocate; that at least half the membership should not have held an animal-testing licence during the last six years; and that the interests of animal welfare should be adequately represented.

There was normally an academic philosopher on the committee, although this was not required by the Act.

Members were appointed for terms of up to four years and may be re-appointed once. Apart from the Chair, members received only expenses.

== Work of the committee ==
The committee advised the Home Secretary on matters concerned with the Act and his functions under it; and also to examine other related subjects considered worthy of further study.

There were four sub-committees: The Applications Sub-committee considered licence applications referred to the Committee for advice; the Education and Training Sub-committee advised on the requirements for training and education of those who held responsibilities under the Act or who carried out duties under the controls of the Act; the Housing and Husbandry Sub-committee considered housing and husbandry issues on a case by case basis as requested by the Committee; the Primate Sub-committee advised on issues relating to the acquisition, housing, care and use of non-human primates in regulated procedures.

In addition, a number of working groups were established. They were created for a particular task and then disbanded. As of March 2010 there were two working groups: The Revision of Directive 86/609 working group is reviewing the directive; the Suffering and Severity working group is reviewing aspects of the system of severity limits and bands.

== Membership ==
As of March 2010, the committee members (and their professional affiliations) were:

- Sara Nathan (chair), freelance journalist
- Professor Hannah Buchanan-Smith, Professor of Behaviour and Evolution Research Group, Department of Psychology, University of Stirling;
- Mike Dennis, Research Scientist, Centre for Emergency Preparedness & Response, Health Protection Agency;
- Dr John Doe, Head of Health Assessment, Syngenta;
- Dr Simon Glendinning, Fellow in European Philosophy in the European Institute at the London School of Economics and Political Science;
- Dr Penny Hawkins, Deputy Head, Research Animals Department, RSPCA;
- Dr Peter Hunt, Biological Standards Officer, Cardiff University;
- Robert Kemp, retired animal technician;
- Professor Keith Kendrick, Head of Cognitive and Behavioural Neuroscience, The Babraham Institute and Professor of Physic, Gresham College;
- Professor Dawn Oliver, Professor of Constitutional Law, University College London;
- Dr Ian S Peers, Director of Statistics, AstraZeneca;
- Professor John Pickard, Professor of Neurosurgery, University of Cambridge, Chairman and Clinical Director Wolfson Brain Imaging Centre, University of Cambridge, Director of Studies for Medical Sciences, St Catharine's College, Cambridge;
- Dr Mark Prescott, Programme Manager, National Centre for the Replacement, Refinement and Reduction of Animals in Research;
- Dr Kenneth Simpson, Scottish Liver Transplantation Unit, The Royal Infirmary of Edinburgh;
- Dr David Smith, Senior Director, AstraZeneca;
- Sarah Wolfensohn

=== Past Chairs ===
- Sara Nathan 2006 onwards
- Michael Banner 1998 to 2006.
- Margaret Brazier 1993-98.
