= Malcolm Singer =

British composer and educationalist

Malcolm Singer (born 13 July 1953) is an English composer and educationalist. He was director of music at The Yehudi Menuhin School between 1998 and 2017.

Singer studied music at Magdalene College, Cambridge, and then with Franco Donatoni (in 1973), with Nadia Boulanger in Paris (from 1974 until 1977), and with György Ligeti in Hamburg (1975–76). In 1980 he was awarded a Harkness Fellowship, studying computer music at Stanford University, California for two years. In 1983 he was appointed musical director of the Zemel Choir (a mixed Jewish choir), staying for a decade. Singer was musical director at The Yehudi Menuhin School for 19 years: having first joined the staff in 1977 he was appointed director in 1998, retiring in 2017. He teaches composition at the Guildhall School of Music, and directs the Composers' Workshop at the Sherborne Summer School of Music. He received the Cobbett medal for services to chamber music in 2012.

Early compositions used serialist techniques, but Singer's interests soon shifted towards minimalism. He is best known for his choral and chamber music. Malcolm Miller identifies in many of the choral pieces "resonant sonorities akin to Pärt or Tavener...enhanced by striking synagogal soundscapes". Fugue (1974), an early piece for spoken voices, uses a self-referential text describing the form of a fugue as the piece takes its course. A Singer's Complaint, a music theater piece written for Jane Manning, won the Chandos Prize at Musica Nova in 1979. Manning was also the soloist in York, a cantata on Jewish subjects composed in 1991.

The chamber music includes Bush Boogie for woodwind and strings (1985), the Quartet for Strings and the Sonata for Piano (both premiered in 1986) and the piano quartet The Grammar of Hope (1989). Orchestral works include a Violin Concerto (1974) and Time Must Have a Stop for piano soloist and orchestra (1976). A recent piece for orchestra, London Landscapes, was commissioned by the Dayton Performing Arts Alliance in 2024.

There are also a number of pieces for young people. Making Music (1984) for narrator and orchestra provides an introductory tour of the orchestra. A Hopeful Place, for children's choir, string octet and orchestra, was conducted by Lord Menuhin at the Royal Albert Hall in 1996. Dragons (1997), is a cantata commissioned by Surrey County Arts for children's choir and youth orchestra, setting poems by Nick Toczek. The Jailer's Tale, a children's opera, was commissioned by the Finchley Children's Music Group in 2009.

Singer married broadcaster Sara Nathan in July 1984 and lives in West London.
