= Sara Nathan (broadcaster) =

British broadcaster

Sara Catherine Nathan (born 16 February 1956) is a former British broadcaster who now sits on the boards of a number of public bodies.

== Early life and education ==
Nathan was educated at Wimbledon High School, Cambridge University and Stanford University which she attended on a Harkness Fellowship. Her college at Cambridge was New Hall and she was vice-president of the Cambridge Union.

== Career ==
=== Broadcasting ===
Nathan was a BBC journalist for 15 years on Newsnight, Breakfast Time and The Money Programme. She was on the launch team for BBC Radio 5 Live and was the first editor of its morning programme. After that she became Britain's first female editor of a TV network news programme when she became editor of Channel 4 News in 1995, a post she held until 1997.

She was a member of the Radio Authority from 1999 to 2003, a founder board member of Ofcom, where her term ended at the end of 2007, and was an Editorial Adviser to the BBC Trust from January 2008 until its abolition in 2016. She has also served on the board of ATVOD, the regulatory agency designated by Ofcom as the "co-regulator" of television on demand. Nathan was a Senior Hearings Manager in BBC HR – mostly working on Equal Pay – from November 2018 to August 2019.

=== Other roles ===
She was a member of the Human Fertilisation and Embryology Authority and of the Professional Conduct Committee of the Bar Council. She was a Commissioner for the Marshall Scholarships until December 2006. She was on the Regulatory Decision Committee of the Financial Services Authority from 2001 to 2007, and was a member of the ICSTIS PhonepayPlus Committee (which regulates premium rate telephony) until November 2008. She chaired The Animal Procedures Committee, a body that advises the British Home Secretary on matters related to animal experimentation in the UK, until its abolition in 2012. She was a lay member of the Judicial Appointments Commission from January 2006 to January 2012.

From April 2012 to 2016 she was a Public Appointments Assessor, chairing the appointment of Chairs of public bodies, reporting to David Normington, the First Civil Service Commissioner, and a chair of disciplinary hearings for the Nursing and Midwifery Council. She was a member of the board of the Solicitors' Regulation Authority from 2010 to 2015. She was also a trustee of Why Me?, a charity promoting restorative justice.

In 2015, Nathan co-founded a charity Refugees at Home, which finds hosts in Britain for destitute asylum-seekers and refugees. She has since hosted 49 refugees (as of June 2026) from many countries including Syria, Sudan, Eritrea, Ethiopia, Iran, Afghanistan and Egypt. The charity has made over 7,750 placements and hosted for over 800,000 individual person nights.

She became a trustee of the Cambridge Union Society in May 2020 and chair of EASE, now Ealing Sanctuary Hub, an asylum-seeker drop-in based in Acton at much the same time.

She was a tribunal chair for the Nursing and Midwifery Council until April 2020.

She has been a tribunal chair for Social Work England since December 2019 and for the General Optical Council since January 2025. She joined the King's Counsel Selection Panel in 2020 and was chair of the appointments board for the Accountants' Regulatory Board at the Institute of Chartered Accountants in England and Wales (ICAEW) for three years.She became a panelist for gross misconduct hearings for the Metropolitan Police in early 2026.

== Honours ==
She was appointed an Officer of the Order of the British Empire (OBE) in the Queen's Birthday Honours, announced on 14 June 2008. She was awarded the Freedom of the Borough of Ealing, in recognition of her work with refugees, in spring 2026.

== Personal life ==
Nathan is married to Malcolm Singer, the composer and now-retired director of music at the Yehudi Menuhin School. She has two adult children and four exhausting but delightful grand-children.
