= Animals in Science Committee =

The Animals in Science Committee is an advisory non-departmental public body created by the British government in 2013 under the auspices of the Animals (Scientific Procedures) Act 1986 as part of its obligation under European Directive 2010/63/EU. It replaces the previous Animal Procedures Committee.
