= Jennifer Dixon =

British physician and charity executive

Dame Jennifer Dixon DBE FRCP FFPH
- Occupation: chief executive of The Health Foundation

Dame Jennifer Dixon is the chief executive of the Health Foundation, a charity in the United Kingdom. Her work has been recognised by national and international bodies for her impact on health policy making.

== Education ==
Dixon has a degree in medicine from the University of Bristol, and a masters in public health and a PhD in health services research both from the London School of Hygiene and Tropical Medicine.

== Career ==
Dixon trained and practised paediatric medicine before moving into public health and policy in 1990. Dixon was awarded a Harkness Fellowship in health policy in 1990 by the Commonwealth Fund in the US, spending a year in New York City.

She was policy advisor to the chief executive of the National Health Service between 1998 and 2000, Director of Policy at the King's Fund until 2008. At the King's Fund she authored analyses including on the role of the market in the NHS, regulation in health care, improving chronic disease management and funding levels in the NHS. She led the development of the nationally adopted quantitative risk stratification tool, Patients at Risk of Re-hospitalisation (PARR) for primary care.

Dixon was chief executive of the Nuffield Trust from 2008 to 2013, Dixon led a team redesigning the NHS resource allocation formula across England for the Department of Health, and which was adopted. She also led a national review for the Secretary of State, Jeremy Hunt, on whether to introduce ratings for NHS and social care providers; CQC later introduced a new inspection and ratings approach.

In 2013 she became chief executive of the Health Foundation. In 2017, the Health Foundation partnered with Robert Bosch Stiftung and Careum Stiftung to launch Sciana, a European network for health leaders. The Health Foundation funded the creation of The Healthcare Improvement Studies (THIS) Institute at the University of Cambridge which launched in 2018 through a grant reported at launch as £42 million.

She is a regular speaker at national and international events. She writes for national newspapers such as The Guardian and appears on current affairs and news programmes such as the BBC and Channel 4 news. Dixon hosts a monthly podcast in health policy and has given evidence at House of Commons and Lords Select Committees and parliamentary seminars. She has been a member of commissions and inquiries, most recently the Pissaridies Review on The Future of Work and Wellbeing and the Pathways to Work Commission, chaired by former Secretary of State for Health Alan Milburn.

Dixon was a trustee of the National Centre for Social Research (NatCen) (2011-2016), and has been on the board of the UK's Care Quality Commission (CQC) (2013-2016), the UK's Audit Commission (2003-2012), the UK's Healthcare Commission (2004-2009) and the UK Health Security Agency (2022–2024).

Dixon led a national enquiry for the Secretary of State for Health, Jeremy Hunt, on whether to introduce quality rating of NHS and social care providers in England (2013) and later another enquiry about ratings for general practices (2015). She was also a member of the Parliamentary Review Panel for the Welsh Assembly Government advising on the future strategy for the NHS and social care in Wales (2016–2018).

She has held visiting professorships at the London School of Economics (LSE), Imperial College London and the London School of Hygiene & Tropical Medicine and co-authored two books on the NHS.

== Honours, awards and recognition ==
Dixon was appointed Commander of the Order of the British Empire (CBE) in the 2013 Birthday Honours for services to public health and Dame Commander of the Order of the British Empire (DBE) in the 2024 New Year Honours for services to the National Health Service and public health.

- 2019: Elected fellow of the Academy of Medical Sciences
- 2016: Awarded honorary Doctor of Science degree from the University of Bristol
- 2009: Elected fellow of the Royal College of Physicians
- 2000: Elected fellow of the Faculty of Public Health
- 1990: Harkness Fellowship

== Other ==
Dixon is an artist under the name Jennifer Vorhaus. Her COVID wire lungs were in the Royal Academy of Arts' Summer Exhibition in 2021.
