= Félicité Du Jeu =

French actress

Félicité du Jeu is a French actress. She is best known for her role as DC Stella Goodman in the BBC drama Waking the Dead.

== Early life ==
Du Jeu studied at the Conservatoire d'Art Dramatique de Saint-Germain-en-Laye from 1992 to 1996, and took the Jean Périmony course the following two years, for which she received the Louis Jouvet prize in 1997. She went on to the London Academy of Music and Dramatic Art and received a special commendation for the Ian Charleson Award for her role as Katherine in Henry V in 2003 with the National Theatre. Before that most of her experience had been gained in theatre in France including Théâtre Dejazet and Théâtre de Boulogne.

== Career ==
She starred in the BBC show Waking the Dead, appearing from the fifth series until the opening episode of the eighth series. Her character was killed off when she suffered a thrombosis after being shot in the leg, thus becoming the second female officer in the show to be killed off, the other being Mel Silver, played by Claire Goose, at the end of series four.

== Personal life ==
A multilingual (French, Italian, Swedish and English) actress, du Jeu acts in French and English.

== Filmography ==
Year	Title	Role	Notes
1998	Quand un ange passe	Marie Chou	1 episode
1999–2001	The Vice	Stacey	2 episodes
2002	Simon: An English Legionnaire	Nicole	
2003	Play-Back		Short
2003	Henry V	Princess Katherine	(National Theatre, dir. Nicholas Hytner)
2004	Pellis		Short
2004	Fakers	Kelly Potrelli	
2004	Poirot: Death on the Nile	Louise Bourget	1 episode
2004	Moving On		Short
2004	Enduring Love	Girl in Logan's Car	
2005	Song of Songs	Abigail	
2005	Munich	Young Swiss Bank Official	
2005–2009	Waking the Dead	DC Stella Goodman	36 episodes
2006	A Good Year	Hostess	
2006	Casino Royale	French News Reporter	
2010	Raw	Lara	RTÉ, 1 episode
2010–2013	Section de recherches	Fanny Caradec	TF1, 24 episodes
2014	Death in Paradise	Natasha Thiebert	BBC- Red planet, 1 episode
2017	Another Mother's Son	Nicole	
2019	Holby City	Françoise Durand	Force Majeure, Series 21, Episode 6
