= Simon Howard =

Simon John Howard is a public health physician working in the North East of England. He has authored or co-authored a number of articles on public health in medical journals, and served as Public Health Registrar to Chief Medical Officer Sally Davies from 2013–2014, acting as Editor-in-Chief of the 2012 Annual Report of the Chief Medical Officer.

== Biography ==
Howard qualified as a medical doctor with the degree MBBS from Newcastle University in 2008. He was awarded an MSc in Public Health and Health Services Research from Newcastle University in 2011.

He has authored and co-authored articles which criticise current nutritional labelling practices in the UK, and on topics related to respiratory, and ophthalmic health. From 2013–2014, Howard served as Public Health Registrar to Chief Medical Officer Sally Davies, and acted as Editor-in-Chief of the 2012 Annual Report of the Chief Medical Officer. He has contributed to or co-authored a number of other works with Davies.

In 2012, Howard co-wrote a study in the British Medical Journal that compared the nutritional content of television chefs' recipes and supermarket meals. The study found that the chefs' meals were "less healthy" than ready-made supermarket meals. The article received considerable coverage in the news media, while some scholars criticised the assumption that "health ought to prominently inform TV cooking."

In 2010, Howard re-published a compilation of his political blog posts in a book titled Instant Opinion. As a medical lexicographer, Howard has served as the lead public health expert contributor to the Oxford Concise Medical Dictionary and Oxford Concise Colour Medical Dictionary from the 2015 editions onwards.
