= Barry Trimmer =

Barry Andrew Trimmer is an American scientist, and the Henry Bromfield Pearson Professor of Natural Sciences at Tufts University. In addition to his primary appointment in the Department of Biology he holds secondary appointments in Biomedical Engineering and in Neuroscience at the Tufts Graduate School of Biomedical Science. His research primarily focuses on neurobiology, biomechanics / neuromechanics and soft-bodied locomotion.

== Biography ==
Trimmer was born in England and received both his B.A. and Ph.D. from Cambridge University, concentrating in neurobiology. He was a Harkness Fellow at Harvard Medical School, and a postdoctoral fellow at the University of California Berkeley and the University of Oregon before joining Tufts University as an assistant professor in 1990. He is director of the Neuromechanics and Biomimetic Devices Laboratory at Tufts University.

His research focus is on the Neuromechanics of Locomotion, the science of how animals control their movements. In addition to his work on living systems, Professor Trimmer specializes in the application of found biological principles to the design and fabrication of Soft Robots. Dr. Trimmer is also Editor in Chief of the journal Soft Robotics. His lab designs and builds a variety of soft robots that are used to test hypotheses about locomotion and to explore new types of control systems. His interests in living systems and robots converge in his recent research that seeks to "grow" robotic devices using a combination of biosynthetic materials, cellular modulation, and tissue engineering. These Biosynthetic Robots will be versatile, safe, biocompatible and biodegradable. Trimmer and his Tufts colleague David L. Kaplan gained international attention in 2007 upon successfully creating the world's first soft-bodied robot. The robot, or SoftBot, is composed of silicone elastomers and resembles a tobacco hornworm, a caterpillar that Trimmer has studied since 1990.

Barry A. Trimmer: List of Published Work:
