= Society of British Neurological Surgeons =

Medical association for British neurosurgeons

- Abbreviation: SBNS
- Formation: 1926
- Type: Professional body
- Legal status: Non-profit company
- Purpose: Neurosurgery in the UK
- Headquarters: Lincoln's Inn Fields, London, WC2
- Region served: Great Britain and Ireland
- Members: British and Irish neurosurgeons
- Main organ: SBNS Council (President - Anne Moore)
- Parent organization: Royal College of Surgeons of England
- Website: SBNS

The Society of British Neurological Surgeons is a medical association for British neurosurgeons.

== History ==
It was formed in 1926, with Sir Geoffrey Jefferson and Professor Norman Dott. Sir Charles Alfred Ballance was the first President. Other founders were Wilfred Trotter, Henry Souttar, Sir Hugh Cairns and Arthur Bankart.

== Structure ==
It is based at the Royal College of Surgeons of England in the London Borough of Camden.

== Function ==
The society promotes the study and advancement of neurosurgery through publications, and engagement with neurosurgeons and public bodies related to neurosurgery. They developed and maintain the National Neurosurgical Audit Programme (NNAP), which produces outcome data for all neurosurgical in patients in England. The organisation publishes the British Journal of Neurosurgery.

== See also ==
- American Neurological Association
- Association of British Neurologists
- Royal Hospital for Neuro-disability
