= Hugh Cairns (surgeon) =

Australian neurosurgeon (1896–1952)

Sir Hugh Cairns
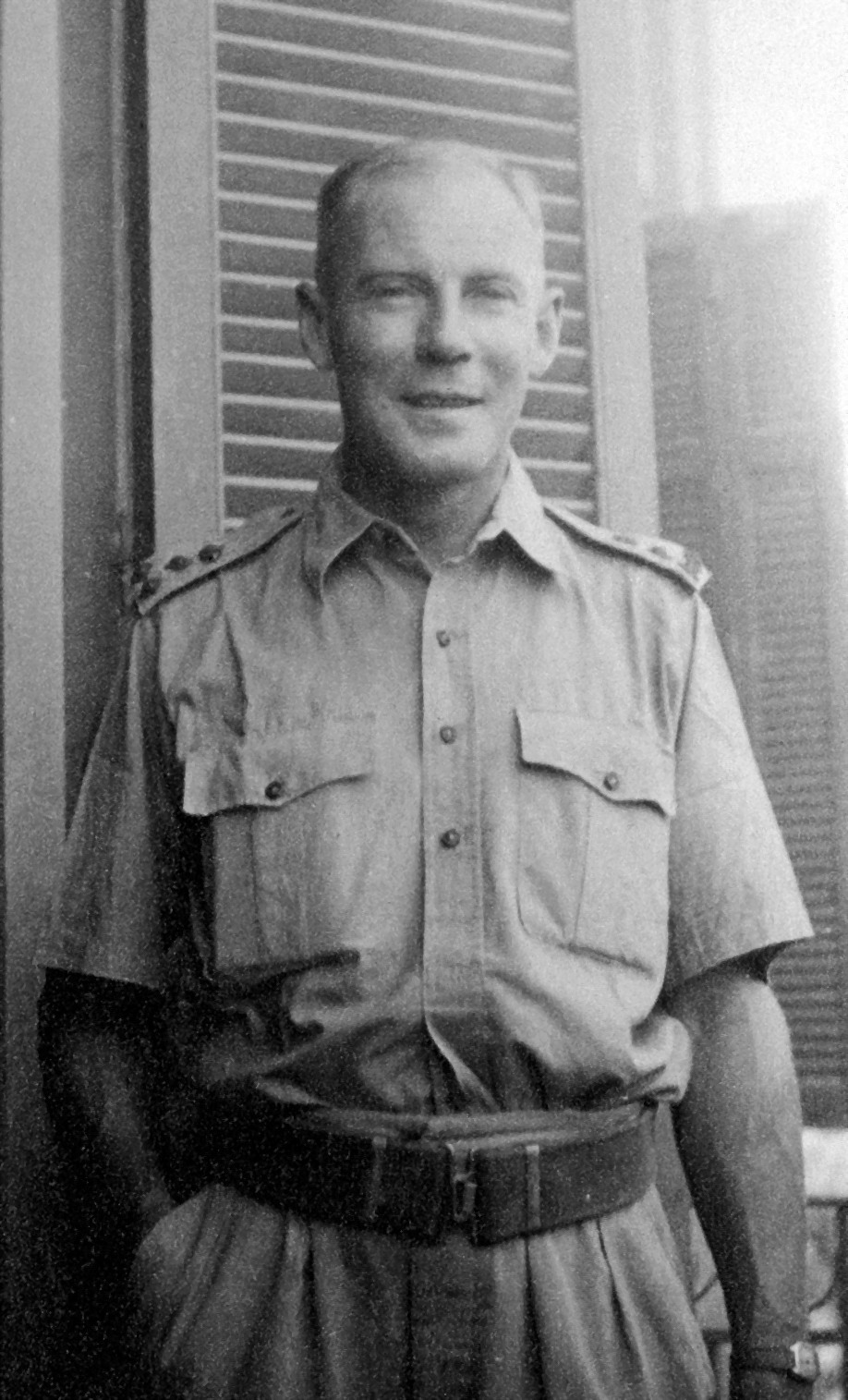
- Born: 26 June 1896; Port Pirie, South Australia
- Died: 18 July 1952 (aged 56); Oxford, England
- Known for: Crash helmets
- Scientific career
- Fields: Neurosurgery

Sir Hugh William Bell Cairns KBE FRCS (26 June 1896 – 18 July 1952) was an Australian neurosurgeon. For most of his life he lived in England. His concern about despatch rider injuries sparked research which led to increased use of motorcycle helmets.

== Early years and education ==
Hugh Cairns was born in Port Pirie, South Australia, but spent his early childhood in Riverton, South Australia where he received all of his primary school education. He went to Adelaide for his secondary education at Adelaide High School and tertiary education at the University of Adelaide. He was awarded the 1917 South Australian Rhodes Scholarship and went to the University of Oxford to read Medicine. He was president of the Balliol Boat Club and represented Oxford at seven in the Boat Race of 1920.

== Career ==
Cairns worked as a neurosurgeon at the London Hospital and with Harvey Cushing at Harvard before setting up the Nuffield Department of Surgery in Oxford, in which he became the first Nuffield Professor of Surgery. He was a key figure in the development of neurosurgery as a speciality, the formation of the Oxford University Medical School, and the treatment of head injuries during the Second World War. He is cited in the U.S Army's Medical Corps reports to the Theater Commanding General as one of the first doctors to treat GEN George S. Patton following his automobile accident on 9 December 1945; Patton died of pulmonary edema twelve days later. The Cairns Library (one of the Bodleian Libraries) at the John Radcliffe Hospital in Oxford is named after him, as is the medical school Hugh Cairns Surgical Society. A blue plaque for him at his 1920s residence at Loughton has been erected.

In June 1946, he received the title of Knight Commander of the Order of the British Empire.

While at the London Hospital and in Oxford, Cairns trained US-born surgeon Joseph Buford Pennybacker, who in 1952 took over as director of the Radcliffe's neurosurgery department, a job he held until he retired in 1971.

Profoundly affected by treating T. E. Lawrence for head injuries during the six days before the latter died after a motorcycle accident, Cairns began a long study of what he saw as the unnecessary loss of life by motorcycle despatch riders through head injuries. His research led to the use of crash helmets by both military and civilian motorcyclists. As a consequence of treating Lawrence, Cairns would ultimately save the lives of many motorcyclists.

== Death and legacy ==
He died of cancer at the Radcliffe Infirmary, Oxford on 18 July 1952. The Society of British Neurological Surgeons established an annual lecture in his name. There is a road named after him at Bedford Park, South Australia, adjacent to Flinders Medical Centre.

A ward at the Walton Centre, Liverpool, is named after him.
