= British Journal of Neurosurgery =

- Discipline: Neurosurgery, neurology
- Language: English
- Edited by: Nitin Mukerji

Publication details
- History: 1987–present
- Publisher: Taylor & Francis
- Frequency: Bimonthly
- Impact factor: 1.29 (2019)

Standard abbreviations
- ISO 4: Br. J. Neurosurg.

Indexing
- CODEN: BJNEEL
- ISSN: 0268-8697 (print); 1360-046X (web)
- LCCN: sn88026253
- OCLC no.: 16716669

Links
- Journal homepage

The British Journal of Neurosurgery is a peer-reviewed medical journal that covers neurosurgery and neurology. It is published in association with the Society of British Neurological Surgeons. The editor-in-chief is Nitin Mukerji.

According to the Journal Citation Reports, the journal has a 2019 impact factor of 1.29. The journal has embraced social media and is present on Twitter as @BJNSNeuro as well as BJNS on LinkedIn.
