= Stacey Roca =

English actress

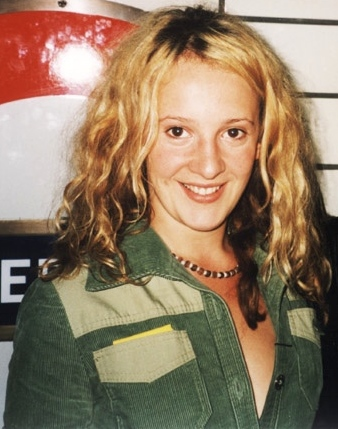
- Roca in Leicester Square tube station in 2001
- Born: Nicola Stacey Roca; 12 September 1978 (age 47); Southport, Merseyside, England
- Occupation: Actress
- Years active: 2001–2021

Stacey Roca (born 12 September 1978 in Southport) is an English actress, known for portraying Rachel in The Office, Claudie Stephenson in Strictly Confidential and Nancy Tench in Netflix drama Mindhunter.

== Background ==
Born in Southport, Roca spent her childhood in Johannesburg, South Africa, and then moved back to England. She attended Formby High School and did her A levels at King George V College in Southport, after which she moved to London.

Roca trained at the Webber Douglas Academy of Dramatic Art. and studied the Meisner technique with Bill Esper at the Esper Studio in New York.

== Career ==
Roca's first professional role was a lead in the Pet Shop Boys' West End musical Closer to Heaven.

Roca made her television debut playing Rachel in The Office. Her other television credits include Murder City, Burn It, Wild at Heart, Lie with Me and Strictly Confidential. She appeared in series eight of the BBC drama Waking the Dead playing Constable, later DS, Katrina "Kat" Howard.

Roca's film credits include Things to Do Before You're 30 (2004) and the short films The Sound of Silence and The Connoisseurs. She played a teacher in Tim Smith's short film Schoolboy, which dealt with teenagers' use of weapons. Having relocated to the United States, Roca appeared in the season finale of CBS drama Bull, which aired May 2017. She was a series regular on the Netflix show Mindhunter, of which season 1 premiered October 2017.

== Filmography ==
=== Television ===
Year	Show	Role	Note
2002	The Office	Rachel – 6 episodes (2002)	Comedy
2003	Burn It	Sue – "Episode 1.1" (2003), "Episode 1.4" (2003)	Drama
2004	Merseybeat	Helen – "Distant Vices" (2004)	Police procedural
2004	Murder City	Dr Megan Finch – "Nothing Sacred" (2004)	Police procedural
2004	Sex & Lies	Office worker	Television film
2004	Swiss Toni	Cable Show (2004)	Situation comedy
2004	Lie with Me	Joanna McCourt	Television film
2005	M.I.T.: Murder Investigation Team	Mags Alderton – "Episode 2.1" (2005)	Police procedural
2005	Doctors	Kelly Brookson – "A Night to Remember" (2005)	Soap opera
2005	Walk Away and I Stumble	Sammi	Television film
2005	Holby City	Jackie Riley – "The Long Goodbye" (2005)	Medical drama
2006	Strictly Confidential	Claudie Stephenson	Drama
2006	Wild at Heart	Ruby Robson – "Episode 1.3" (2006)	Drama
2009	Waking the Dead	DS Katrina "Kat" Howard	Police procedural
2010	Ladies of Letters	Lesley Crabtree – 7 episodes (2010)	Comedy
2011	White Van Man	Susan	Comedy
2011	Shameless	Alayha Marsh	Comedy drama
2017	Bull	Cecilia Novak	Legal drama
2017	Mindhunter	Nancy Tench	Drama
2019	The Blacklist	Hannah Hayes – "Hannah Hayes (No. 125)" (2019)	Crime drama
2020	The Expanse	Lydia	Science fiction drama
2021	Bull	Tracey Brennan	Legal drama

=== Film ===
Year	Film	Role	Notes
2004	Things to Do Before You're 30	Gina Moncur	Feature film
2004	The Sound of Silence	Woman Upstairs	Short film
2007	Schoolboy	Teacher	Short film
2009	The Connoisseurs	Letty	Short film
