= Health Foundation =

UK charity and think tank

The Health Foundation is an independent charity and think tank for health care for people in the UK.

The organisation's aim is a healthier population, supported by high quality health care that can be equitably accessed. Its programs include making grants to those working at the front line, carrying out research and policy analysis.

== History ==
As the second largest endowed foundation in the UK focusing on health, they spend around £30 million a year on improving health and health care.

The Health Foundation was founded in 1983 as the PPP Medical Trust with a donation of £350,000 a year from Private Patients Plan Limited. In 1998, the organisation, then named the PPP Healthcare Medical Trust, became fully independent with an endowment of approximately £540 million resulting from the sale of the PPP Healthcare group to Guardian Royal Exchange. In 2003 the organisation was renamed the Health Foundation to signal its completely independent status as a grant-making charity. The Health Foundation has no connection to PPP and is accountable only to its independent board of trustees and the Charity Commission.

== Notable people ==
=== Board of governors ===
- The chair of governors is Sir Hugh Taylor.
- David Nigel Dalton
- Dawn Edge, researcher and lecturer in psychology
- Ruth Hussey
- Rosalind Louise Smyth, paediatrician and professor of child health

=== Directors ===
- Jennifer Dixon is chief executive of the Health Foundation.
