= Simon Kunz =

Actor

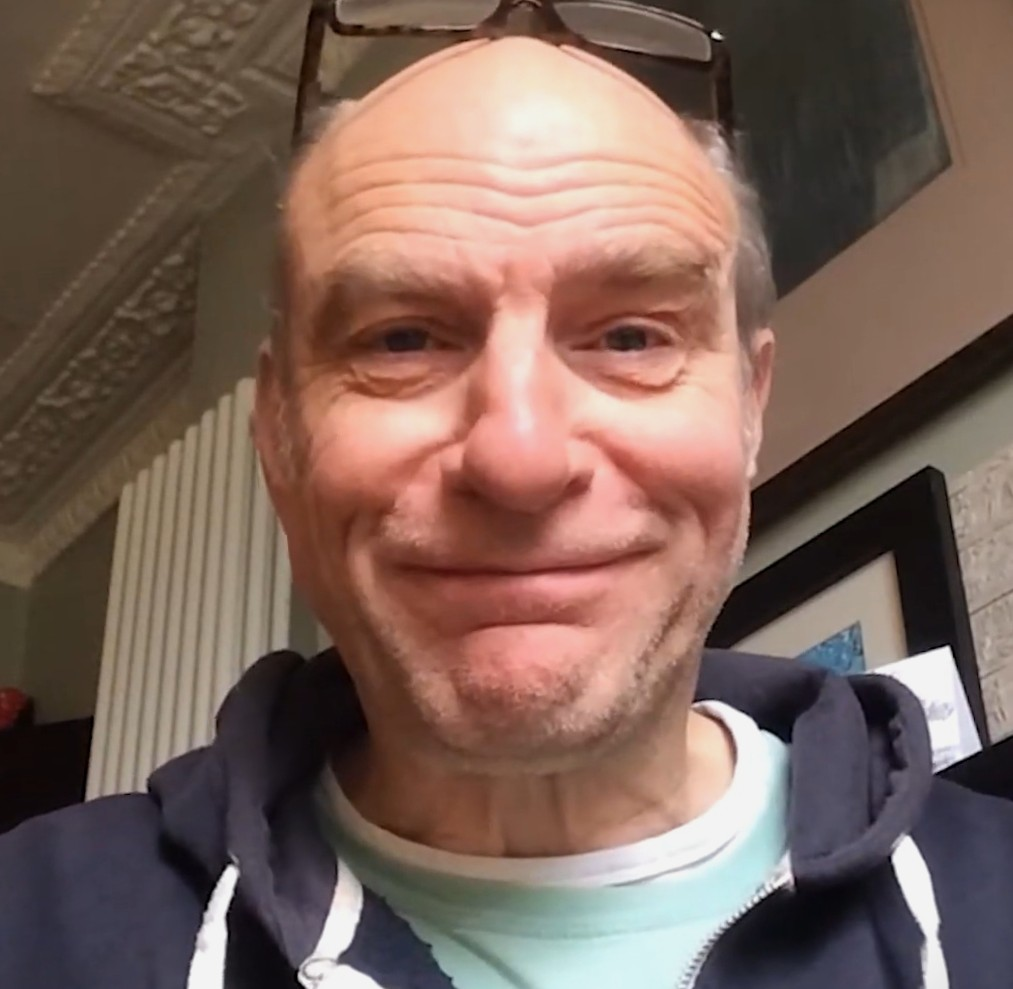
- Kunz in 2021
- Education: University of Warwick
- Occupation: Actor
- Years active: 1992–present
- Relatives: Charlie Kunz (grandfather)

Simon Kunz is an actor on stage and screen.

== Early life ==
He attended Latymer Upper School, then completed a degree in Theatre Studies at the University of Warwick.

== Career ==
He appeared in The Parent Trap as Martin in one of his first roles in film. He appeared as a lead character in the first two seasons of the BBC/BBC America/Netflix historical television drama, The Last Kingdom.

Of his stage performances, his role as Max in Address Unknown (2013) at the Soho Theatre, London, was described as a "superb performance" of a "study in dawning agony".

== Filmography ==
=== Selected filmography ===
| Year | Title | Role | Notes |
|---|---|---|---|
| 1994 | Four Weddings and a Funeral | John with the Unfaithful Wife – Wedding One | |
| 1995 | The Young Poisoner's Handbook | John | |
| 1995 | GoldenEye | Severnaya Duty Officer | |
| 1998 | The Parent Trap | Martin | |
| 1998 | Jeremiah | Gemariah | TV film |
| 1999 | Tube Tales | White Pinstripe Suit Man | (segment "Steal Away") |
| 2001 | The Bunker | Lt. Wilhelm Krupp | |
| 2001 | The Affair of the Necklace | Minister of Titles | |
| 2005 | The Cave | Mike – Caver #1 | |
| 2005 | Red Mercury | Briggs | |
| 2006 | Désaccord parfait | Randall | |
| 2006 | January 2nd | Frank | |
| 2007 | I Could Never Be Your Woman | Intruder | |
| 2008 | City of Ember | Captain Fleery | |
| 2011 | Just Henry | Inspector Titmus | TV film |
| 2011 | Captain America: The First Avenger | US Army doctor | |
| 2012 | A Fantastic Fear of Everything | Police Sergeant Smythe | |
| 2013 | Trance | Surgeon | |
| 2013 | Alan Partridge: Alpha Papa | Conner Scott | |
| 2013 | Walking with the Enemy | Jozsef Greenberg | |
| 2014 | Son of God | Nicodemus | |
| 2014 | Get Santa | Ugly Sister | |
| 2015 | Winter | Dr. Allen | |
| 2017 | The Foreigner | Matthew Rice | |
| 2020 | Blithe Spirit | Henry Mackintosh | |
| 2025 | F1 | Don Cavendish | |
| TBA | Jericho Ridge | | Post-production |

=== TV ===
| Year | Title | Role | Notes |
|---|---|---|---|
| 1996 | Highlander: The Series | Damon Case | |
| 1993–2006 | The Bill | James Allinson / D.C.I. Calder / Simon Nicholls / Mr. Flint | |
| 1993 | Minder | Anderson | Episode: "I'll Never Forget Whats'ername" |
| 1997 | Brass Eye | Graham / Captain Mervyn Bruge / Senator Dale Lee Agsby | Episodes: "Sex", "Decline"' |
| 2000–2002 | Casualty | Tony Eastwood / John | |
| 2002–2004 | My Family | Geoffrey, Auctioneer | |
| 2004 | Auf Wiedersehen Pet | Evan Trasker | |
| 2004 | Rosemary and Thyme | Chris Stevens | Episode: "The Memory of Water" |
| 2005–2015 | Midsomer Murders | Miles Rattigan, Bruce Hartley | |
| 2006 | Ancient Rome: The Rise and Fall of an Empire | Attalus | |
| 2007 | M.I. High | Roger Powell | The Big Freeze |
| 2010 | The IT Crowd | Judge | Episode: "Reynholm vs Reynholm" |
| 2011 | Silent Witness | Assistant Chief Constable Matthew Maynard | Episode: "Lost" (series 14) |
| 2013 | The Bible | Nicodemus | |
| 2014–2017 | Sherlock | Sir Edwin | |
| 2015–2017 | The Last Kingdom | Odda the Elder | |
| 2017 | Gunpowder | Lord Howard | |
| 2018 | Requiem | Lloyd Satlow | |
| 2019 | Jerusalem | Herbert Quick | main role, post-production |
| 2021 | This Time with Alan Partridge | Father Paul | S2; E1 |
| 2021 | Deceit | Sir Harry Ognall | Episode 4 |

== Theatre ==
- Comedians
- Blood and Gifts
- 55 Days
- Address Unknown, Soho Theatre (2013)
