= Albany Billiard Ball Company =

American manufacturer of billiard balls

- Industry: Manufacturing, Cue Sports
- Founded: 1868 in Albany, New York
- Founder: John Wesley Hyatt
- Defunct: 1986
- Headquarters: Albany, New York, USA
- Products: Billiard balls

The Albany Billiard Ball Company was an American manufacturer of billiard balls based in Albany, New York. The company was founded in 1868, manufacturing for over 100 years, before going out of business in 1986.

== History ==
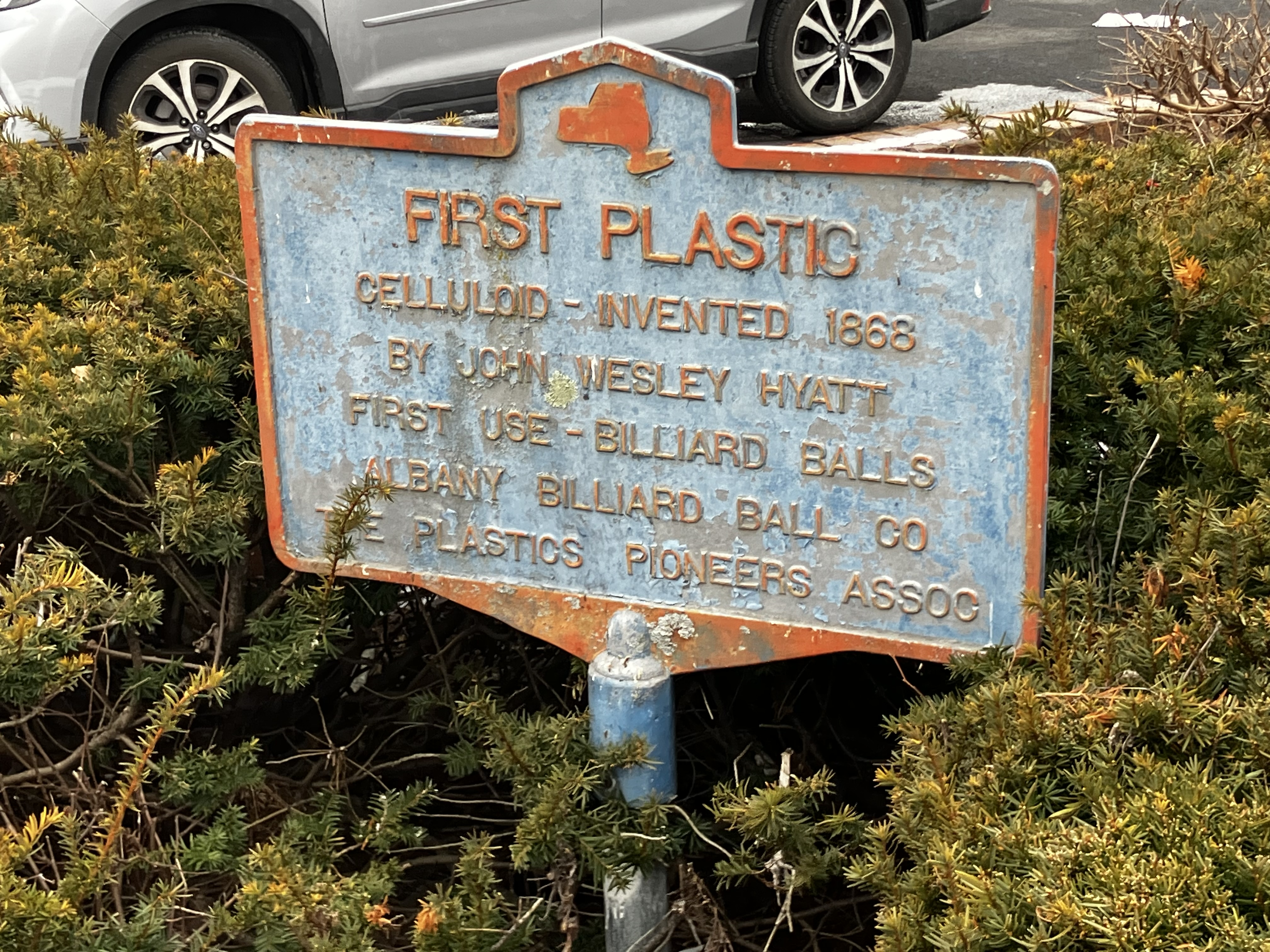
Historic marker in Albany, New York, noting the invention of celluloid in 1868

In the 1860s, John Wesley Hyatt of Albany, New York acquired British chemist Alexander Parkes's 1855 patent for Parkesine, an early polymer, made of nitrocellulose, oil and various solvents. Parkes's own attempt to build a business around the new material, the first industrial plastic, had failed by 1868. Hyatt began experimenting with cellulose nitrate with the intention of manufacturing billiard balls, which until that time were principally made from ivory (cheaper balls were made of clay or wood). Using cloth, ivory dust, and shellac, Hyatt devised a method of covering billiard balls with the addition of collodion in 1868.

To manufacture the product, Hyatt formed the Albany Billiard Ball Company, in Albany, New York's South End in 1868, with assistance from Peter Kinnear and other investors. Hyatt received a patent on nitrocellulose innovation on April 6, 1869. The company initially operated out a machine shop owned by Kinnear, who ultimately became the majority owner and steered the company to market and financial success.

In 1870, John and his brother Isaiah patented a process of making a "horn-like material" with the inclusion of nitrocellulose and camphor, and founded a second business, Albany Dental Plate Co. (later the Celluloid Manufacturing Co.), to manufacture more than sporting goods. Alexander Parkes had used camphor among his Parkesine solvents, and another Englishman who had worked with Parkes, Daniel Spill, listed camphor as an ingredient in his own variant of nitrocellulose polymer, Xylonite, but it was the Hyatt brothers who recognized the value of camphor's use as a plasticizer for nitrocellulose. Isaiah Hyatt dubbed their material, using this method, Celluloid in 1872. It was put to use by the Albany Billiard Ball Company and its sister company, Albany Dental Plate Co. (later the Celluloid Manufacturing Co.) The name "celluloid" has long since become a genericized trademark.

Albany's celluloid-based composite material pool balls dominated the US market until the 1960s, when the increased availability of cheap, imported balls almost ruined the company. Investor David M. Carey acquired the company and renamed it the Albany–Hyatt Billiard Ball Company in September 1977, and made the company competitive again with lowered production costs and a new marketing strategy. By this time, it was the last remaining US-based major billiard ball manufacturer.

By the early 1980s, Albany was using the newer, superior phenolic resin, like their Belgium-based competitor Saluc (today the dominant company in the market). Despite this modernization, Albany–Hyatt went out of business in 1986.

== See also ==
- List of sporting goods manufacturers
