= John Carbutt =

English photographer and businessman (1832-1905)

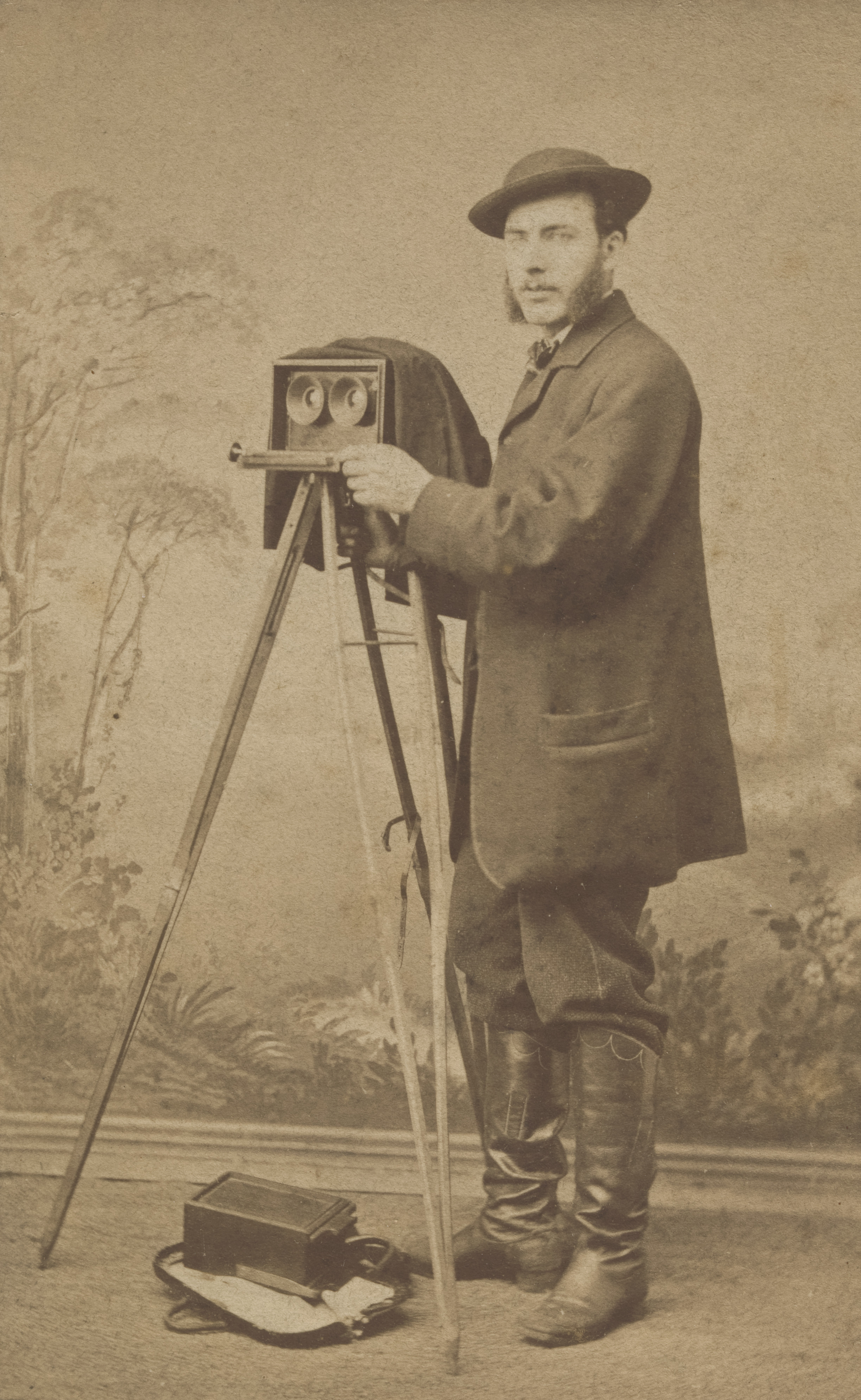
- Born: December 2, 1832; Sheffield, England
- Died: July 26, 1905 (aged 72); Philadelphia, Pennsylvania, U.S.
- Resting place: West Laurel Hill Cemetery, Bala Cynwyd, Pennsylvania, U.S.
- Occupations: Photographer, photographic plate manufacturer

John Carbutt (December 2, 1832– July 26, 1905) was an English photographer and businessman. He created stereograms of his excursions in Minnesota, along the Mississippi River, Niagara Falls, and the Rocky Mountains. He worked as a photographer for the Grand Trunk Railway and the Chicago and North Western Railway. He was the official photographer of the Canadian Pacific Railway and the Union Pacific Railroad during the construction of their transcontinental railroad lines.

In 1879, he founded the Keystone Dry Plate Works. He was an innovator in the development of photographic plates and the first to commercially produce gelatin dry plates in the United States. He was the first to produce celluloid film of high quality for photographic use. This film was provided to William Kennedy Dickson and Thomas Edison for usage in their Kinetoscope.

== Early life ==
He was born in Sheffield, England, on December 2, 1832, to Robert and Ann Carbutt. He moved to Canada in 1853 and worked as a photographer from 1853 to 1857 for the Grand Trunk Railway. He worked as a photographer at the Cosmopolitan Gallery in Plymouth, Indiana, from 1858 to 1861. He worked with ambrotype, melainotype, photographs, and stereograms. He returned to Sheffield, England, in 1861 and opened a photographic studio there but moved back to the United States later that year and opened a studio in Chicago, Illinois.

== Career ==
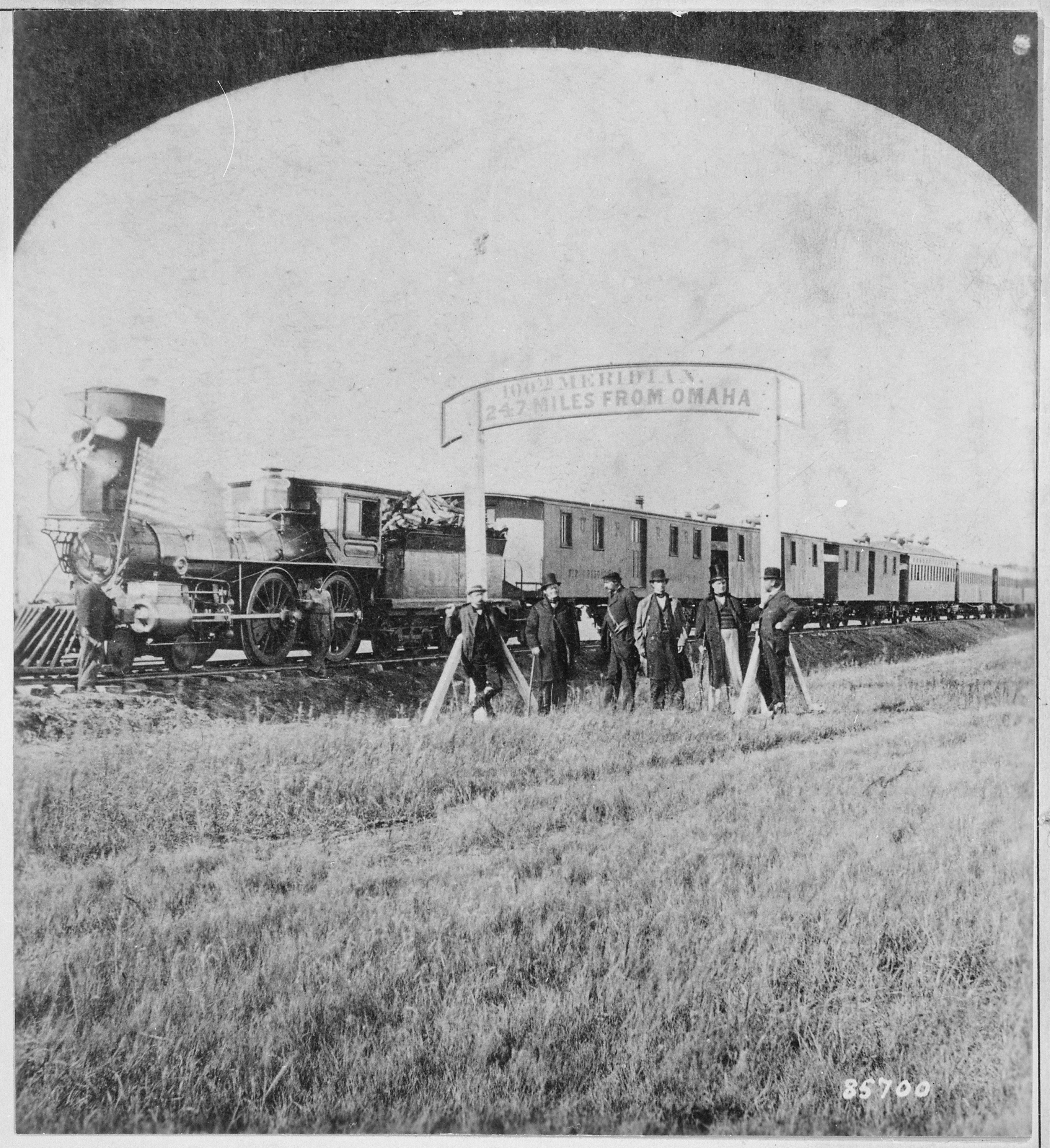
Carbutt photo of the Gathering the Directors of the Union Pacific Railroad on the 100th meridian.

He was the first Chicago-based photographer to develop carte de visite. He gained experience with dry-plate photography as the official photographer during the construction of the Canadian Pacific Railway. In October 1865, he was commissioned to photograph the route of the Northwestern Union Packet Company which included notable locations in Minnesota such as Barn Bluff, Fort Snelling, and Saint Anthony Falls. He travelled with photographer Edward Livingston Wilson in Minnesota to photograph Minnehana Falls. He created a series of stereograms of excursions on the Mississippi River and at Niagara Falls.

In 1866, he was hired by the Union Pacific Railroad to document the promotional event of the transcontinental railroad construction reaching the 100th Meridian. He took photos of railroad construction, new towns along the railway, and the camps of the Pawnee people. He produced a series of stereograms titled Rail Road Excursion to the 100th Meridian taken between Omaha, Nebraska, and 100th Meridian.

In 1867, he purchased stereographic negatives from William H. Illingworth of his images taken during James L. Fisk's 1866 expedition to find a wagon route from Minnesota to Montana. Carbutt published these images under the title Crossing the Plains with Capt. Fisk's Expedition, 1866. He was commissioned by the Chicago and North Western Railway to photograph the rail route including the iron mining activity near Lake Superior. He worked again with the Union Pacific Railroad and travelled west to Colorado to create stereograms of the Rocky Mountains. In 1869, he took part in an initiative to photograph a solar eclipse in Mount Pleasant, Iowa.

In 1868, he developed a process to use gelatin instead of the Collodion-albumen process in the development of dry plates at his studio in Chicago. In 1870, he sold his Chicago studio. In 1871, he began working with the gelatin intaglio process and moved to Philadelphia to commercialize it. He worked as superintendent of the American Photographic Relief Company from 1870 to 1874. However, the process was too expensive and unprofitable.

In 1876, he served during the Centennial Exposition in Philadelphia as supervisor of the Photographic Hall.

Carbutt founded the Keystone Dry Plate Works in 1879. This was the first production of gelatin dry plates in the United States. His innovations included development of the first gelatine-bromide dry plates in 1879, the first orthochromatic dry plates in 1886, the first celluloid dry plates in 1888, and the first commercial X-ray plates in 1896. His company was known for their high quality lantern slides used in magic lantern projectors.

In November 1888, Carbutt produced the first celluloid film one hundredth on an inch thick of high enough quality to be used in photography. This was supplied to William Kennedy Dickson and Thomas Edison for usage in their Kinetoscope. He later experimented with color photography and color screens used in photoengraving.

He was a member of the Franklin Institute and the first president of the Photographic Association of America.

Carbutt died of kidney disease at his home in the Germantown neighborhood of Philadelphia on July 25, 1905, and was interred at West Laurel Hill Cemetery in Bala Cynwyd, Pennsylvania.

== See also ==
- History of photography
