= Harrison Radiator Corporation =

American automotive radiator manufacturer

Harrison Radiator Corporation was an early manufacturer of automotive radiators and heat exchangers for crewed spacecraft and guided missiles, as well as various cooling equipment for automotive, marine, industrial, nuclear, and aerospace applications, (particularly for space suits of the first two U.S. human space flights) that became a division of General Motors in 1918. Today its business is a part of General Motors' Automotive Components Group, and is based in Lockport, Niagara County, New York.

== History ==
The company was known in 1910, as the Harrison Radiator Company, by Herbert C. Harrison, an inventor and entrepreneur. Harrison's technical background in metallurgy and the "Harrison Hexagon" honeycomb radiator had advantages in design (hexagon cellular efficient heat distribution) and manufacturing so that leakages became rare. The first hand-built radiator was sold in 1911 to the Remington Standard Motor Company of New York.

In 1916 the company was sold to William C. Durant, the owner of the United Motors Company. The Wall Street Journal commented:

"The company has large contracts with the Mitchell, Hupp, and Chandler, among other motor companies, and the increased facilities will enable it to accept contracts with the Olds, the Oakland, and the Chevrolet motor companies.

Durant, also the founder of General Motors, created United Motors to begin vertical integration of the automobile industry. United Motors was run by Alfred P. Sloan. Durant lost control of General Motors in 1910 and established Chevrolet as his principal manufacturing company. He regained control of General Motors in 1916 through a merger with Chevrolet, and in 1918 he sold United Motors to General Motors.

Other divisions of United Motors included the Hyatt Roller Bearing Company (roller bearings), New Departure Manufacturing Company (ball bearings), Remy Electric Company (electrical starting, lighting, and ignition equipment), Dayton Engineering Laboratories Company, later known as Delco Electronics Corporation (electrical equipment), the Perlman Rim Corporation and Klaxon Horn.

Herbert Harrison remained President of Harrison Radiator until his death in 1927.

By 1929, the company was manufacturing 2.3 million radiators annually. It later became the division of GM responsible for manufacturing air conditioning units as well as radiators. In 1995, General Motors formed a subsidiary for its components' divisions, called Delphi Automotive Systems (later Delphi Corporation) and the Harrison Radiator business was renamed Delphi Harrison Thermal Systems. Delphi was spun off as an independent company in 1999. Delphi filed for bankruptcy in 2005 and emerged in 2009. The Harrison business and the Lockport manufacturing plant were repurchased by General Motors as part of its GM Components Holdings subsidiary in October 2009.

== See also ==
- Auto parts suppliers of the United States
- Rochester Products Division
