= ACDelco =

General Motors' American automotive parts subsidiary

- Type: Subsidiary
- Industry: Automotive supplier
- Founded: 1974; 52 years ago
- Headquarters: Warren, Michigan, U.S.
- Parent: General Motors
- Website: gmparts.com

ACDelco is an American automotive parts brand owned by General Motors, which also offers aftermarket parts for non-GM vehicles. Over its long history it has been known by various names such as United Motors Corporation, United Motors Service, and United Delco. The brand "ACDelco" should not be confused with GM's former AC Delco Systems, formed in 1994 from the merger of AC Rochester Division and Delco Remy Division. In 1995 Delphi Automotive Systems absorbed AC Delco Systems.

== History ==
United Motors Corporation was formed by William C. Durant in 1916 as an automotive component and accessory holding company. Durant was the owner of Buick and founder of General Motors in 1908. After he lost control of General Motors in 1910, he founded Chevrolet in 1911 with Louis Chevrolet and the profits from this permitted him to regain control of GM in 1916. At approximately the same time, he assembled United Motors.

Durant's founding of United Motors has parallels in his earlier experience in the horse-drawn carriage industry in Michigan. In the late 19th century he was co-owner of the Durant-Dort Carriage Company, one of the nation's leading carriage manufacturers. Concerned that they could not source components and raw materials at affordable prices or in sufficient quantities, Durant-Dort created a vertically-integrated operation owning hardwood forests and manufacturing its own bodies, wheels, axles, upholstery, springs, varnish and whips.

United Motors initially included Alfred P. Sloan's Hyatt Roller Bearing Company (antifriction roller bearings), New Departure Manufacturing Company (ball bearings), Remy Electric Company (electrical starting, lighting, and ignition equipment), Charles Kettering and Edward A. Deeds' Dayton Engineering Laboratories Company (DELCO automotive ignition, starters and generators), and the Perlman Rim Corporation.

Durant appointed Alfred P. Sloan, who had been president of Hyatt, as president of United Motors. In the next two years, Sloan bought the Harrison Radiator Corporation, Lovell-McConnell Manufacturing Company (renamed Klaxon company to make Klaxon horns) in September 1916, and organized United Motors Service to sell and service the entire line of products nationwide.

=== General Motors – United Motors Service ===
United Motors was originally independent of General Motors, selling to all manufacturers until 1918, when the company was acquired by General Motors for $45 million (three quarters debentures and one quarter common shares) and integrated into GM on December 31, 1918.

United Motors became United Motors Service and continued to operate essentially as it had before. However, all of its production was now devoted to GM's brands. Alfred P. Sloan continued as the division manager, which carried with it a GM vice-president title and a position on the GM board. In 1923 he became President of General Motors and was Chairman when he retired in 1956. Charles Kettering, co-founder of Delco, was head of research at General Motors for 27 years. Herbert C. Harrison was President of Harrison Radiator until his death in 1927. William C. Durant lost control of GM for the final time in 1920.

United Motors Service would become a fully integrated division of General Motors in 1944.

=== United Delco ===
Around 1960, the division's name was changed to United Delco. With the Delco name becoming more well known with consumers, the “Delco” name was incorporated into all of the division's branches (Delco Remy, Delco Harrison, Delco Packard (Packard Electric), Delco Moraine). A red and blue semicircular logo was implemented, designed by Lance Wyman (who would later famously design the graphic identity for the 1968 Mexico City Olympics, among other projects).

=== AC Spark Plug Division ===
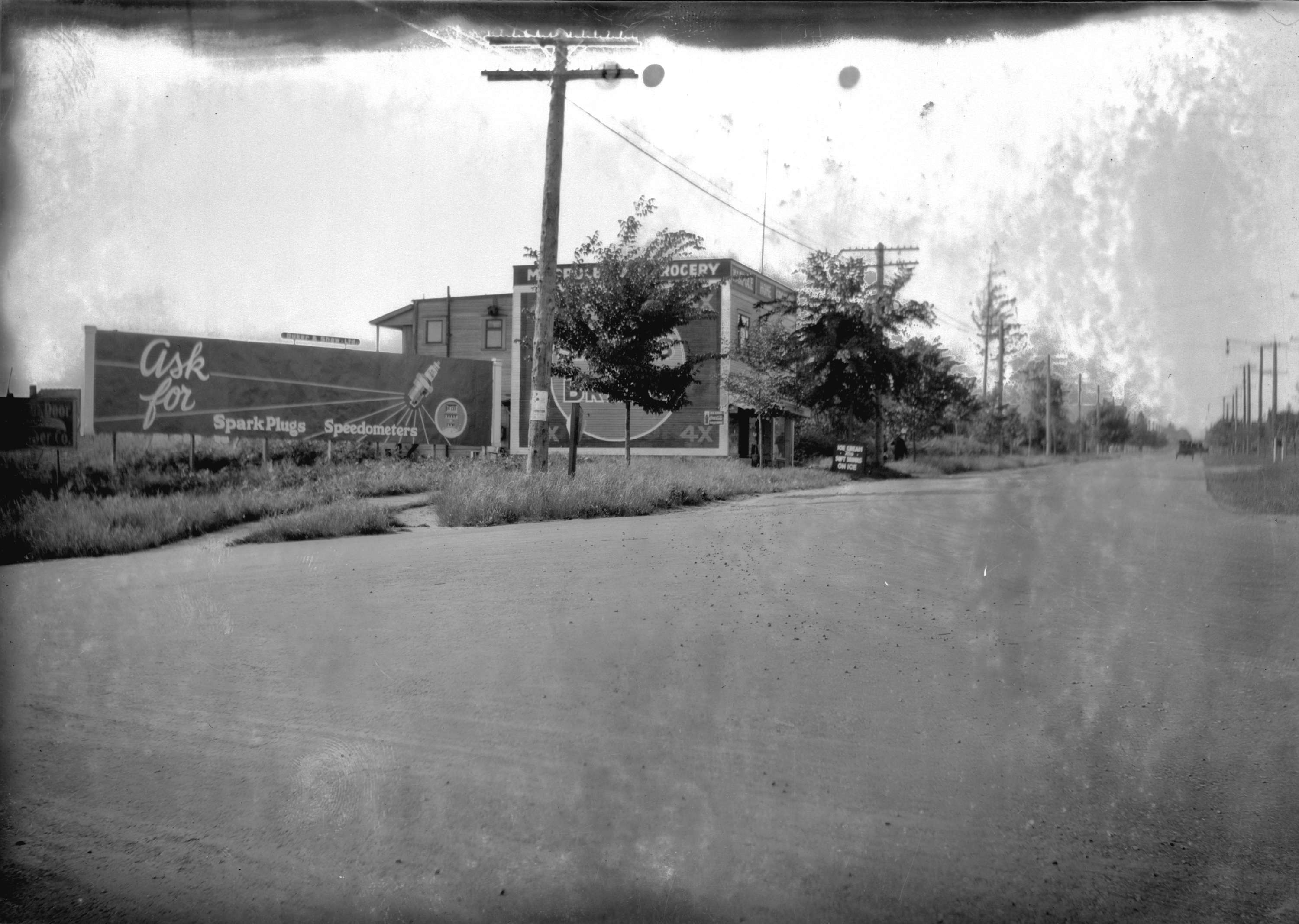
Billboard for AC spark plugs in Vancouver circa 1926

In 1899, Albert Champion came to the U.S. as a champion bicycle racer. He founded the Champion Spark Plug Company with the Stranahan brothers in 1905 and began production in 1907. In 1908, William C. Durant of the Buick Motor Co. asked to see some of Champion's prototypes. Buick at that time was using Rajah spark plugs. Durant thought they could manufacture spark plugs to Champion's design cheaper than buying them from Rajah, and set Champion up in a workshop in Flint, Michigan as part of the budding auto industry there.

Champion went to work producing spark plugs to be used in Buick automobiles. Champion and Durant formed "Champion Ignition Co." Very shortly later, the Stranahan brothers ("Champion Spark Plug Co.") informed them they could not use the name "Champion" as they had it trademarked, so Champion changed the name to Champion's initials, AC Spark Plug. In 1927 AC Spark Plugs was bought by General Motors.

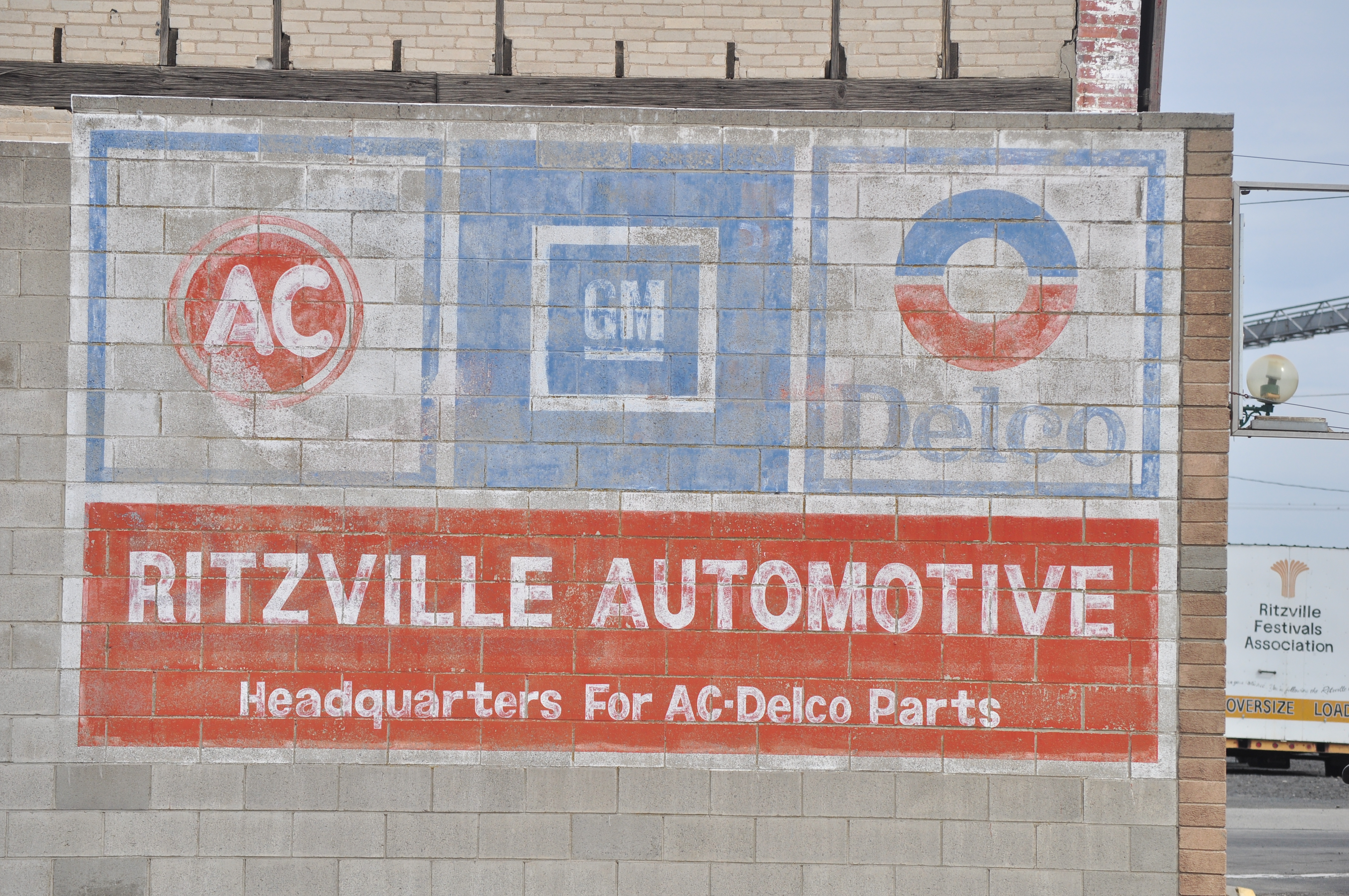
Old GM AC-Delco ad on the side of a building in Ritzville, Washington, U.S.

=== AC-Delco ===
In 1974, in an effort to streamline its operations and marketing, General Motors merged AC Spark Plug's aftersales operation with United Delco to create the new AC-Delco (Albert Champion Dayton Engineering Laboratories Company.) AC-Delco then marketed various AC and Delco-branded products.

=== ACDelco ===
1995 saw a re-branding of AC-Delco. The hyphen was dropped and ACDelco received a new logo and marketing initiative. The "AC" bullseye and semicircular Delco logo disappeared from product packaging.

== See also ==
- Mopar (Chrysler's auto parts brand)
- Motorcraft (Ford's auto parts brand)
- Unipart (British Leyland/Rover Group former auto parts brand)
