= Keystone Dry Plate Works =

Coordinates: 40.023°N 75.161°W

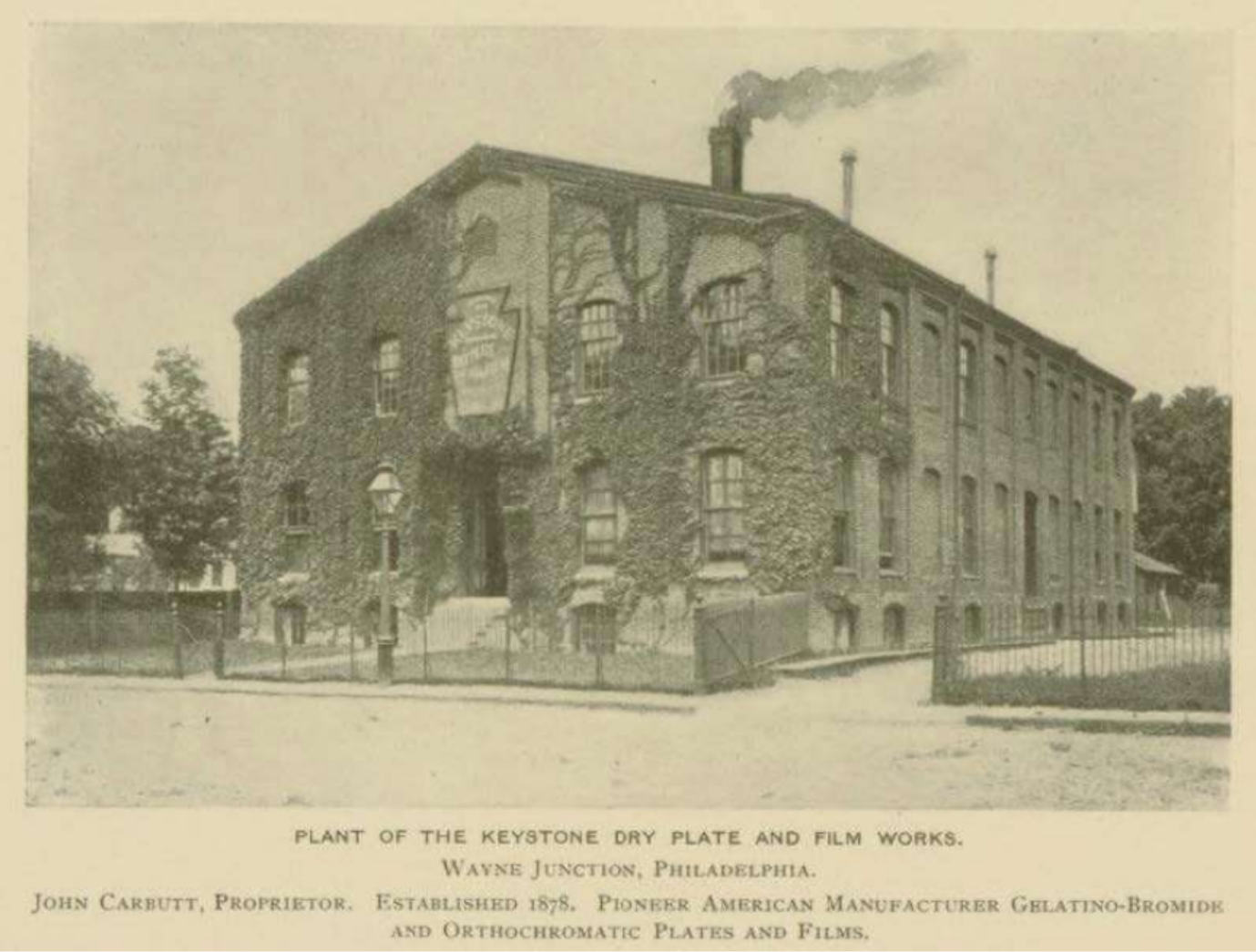
Keystone Dry Plate Works in 1899

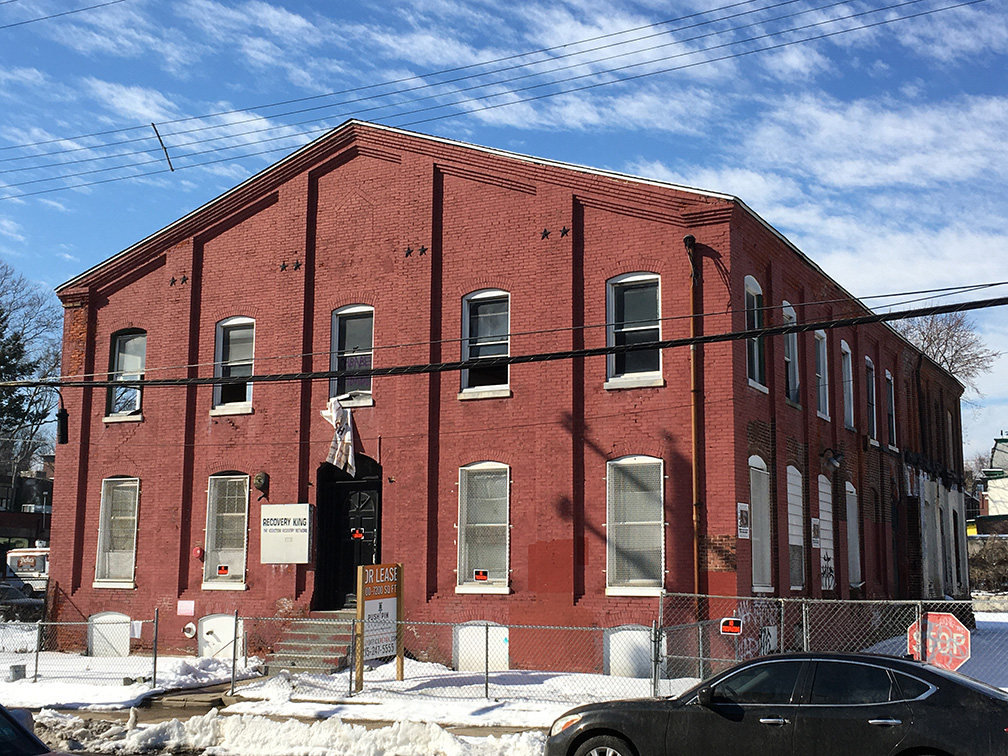
Factory built for Keystone Dry Plate Works in 1879, showing appearance in February 2021.

The Keystone Dry Plate and Film Works was founded by John Carbutt in 1879 in Philadelphia, and its 113 Berkley Street location was constructed in Germantown in 1884. The factory became the location for his pioneering work in new photographic technologies, including improved glass plate photography, x-ray imaging, the first 35 mm celluloid film, and very early color photography procedures.

Carbutt developed the first gelatine-bromide dry plates (1879), the first orthochromatic dry plates (1886) and the first celluloid dry plates(1888) in this location. He produced the first 35mm film here and sold it to Thomas Edison. In 1888, he introduced the less than a decade-old Edison light bulb to increase productivity in his factory, and in 1896, Carbutt began to manufacture the first x-ray plates for commercial use. In his later years, Carbutt experimented with color photography.

John Carbutt died in 1905. In the early 20th century the factory was bought by Defender Photo Supply, based in Rochester, NY, and became known as the Defender Dry Plate Company. From 1912 to 1977 the building was occupied by Moore Push Pin Company; Edwin Moore invented and patented the push pin, and subsequent occupants included a drug rehab facility. The building forms part of a cluster of 19th-century industrial buildings around Wayne Junction rail station.

In January 2021, Ken Weinstein, the current owner of the property through Wayne Junction Properties/Philly Office Retail, submitted a financial hardship application to the Philadelphia Historical Commission to permit the building to be demolished.
