= BX Plastics =

Plastics engineering and production company

BX Plastics was a plastics engineering and production company. The company was one of three subsidiaries of the British Xylonite Company established by 1938. BX Plastics made xylonite (also known as celluloid or ivoride) and Lactoid (also known as casein) at a plant to the south of Brantham in Suffolk, on the north bank of the River Stour across the river from Manningtree in Essex. The company was liquidated in 1999.

== History ==
The British Xylonite Company was established by English inventor Daniel Spill in 1877, in collaboration with American investor Levi Parsons Merriam. It established factories at Hackney Wick and Homerton, in east London, subsequently expanding to Brooklands Farm near Brantham in 1887 and Hale End, Walthamstow in 1897.

By 1938 British Xylonite had established three subsidiaries - BX Plastics, Halex and Cascelloid. Halex was based in Highams Park, Hale End, in north London and made finished goods (including table tennis balls). Cascelloid, based in Leicester and Coalville, made toys and had been acquired in 1931. Cascelloid was later renamed Palitoy and sold to General Mills in 1968 and then to Tonka 1987, which was acquired by Hasbro in 1991.

Distillers acquired a 50% interest in BX Plastics in 1939. Distillers then acquired the rest of the British Xylonite group in 1961, merging it into a 50:50 joint venture with Union Carbide's Bakelite company in 1962 to form Bakelite Xylonite in 1963. Distillers sold its 50% interest to BP in 1967, and Union Carbide's European interests were acquired by BP in 1978, including the remaining Bakelite Xylonite plants.

The Brantham site had been sold in 1966 to British Industrial Plastics, a subsidiary of Turner & Newall, who were in turn acquired Storey Brothers of Lancaster in 1977. The company became Wardle Storeys in 1984. The site finally closed in 2007.

== Research ==
BX Plastics established a research department at Lawford Place, a manor house in nearby Lawford, south of Manningtree in Essex. Margaret Thatcher worked there as a research chemist from 1947 to 1951, before her marriage to Denis Thatcher and subsequent career change to become a tax barrister and then a politician. The company held several patents on plastic products and manufacturing processes in the 1960s.

The house was damaged by a fire and remained unoccupied for many years, but received a Grade II listing in 1980. It was refurbished as part of a residential development in 2009.
