= Herbert C. Harrison =

American businessman (1876–1927)

Herbert Champion Harrison
- Born: October 4, 1876; Calcutta, India
- Died: March 6, 1927 (aged 50); London, England
- Resting place: Christ Church, Shirley (Croydon) London
- Education: Oxford University
- Spouse: Florence Maria Kemp
- Children: Arthur Brydges Branfill Harrison; Charles Aylett Harrison; John Egerton Harrison
- Parent(s): Edward Francis Harrison; Lilian Reily

Herbert Champion Harrison (October 4, 1876 – March 6, 1927), is credited with the invention and development of the modern hexagon cellular "honeycomb" automotive radiator and was the founder of the Harrison Radiator Company in 1910. Born in Calcutta, India to British parents, his father was the Controller General of the Indian Civil Service in the British Empire. One of 12 children, Harrison’s siblings included the British civil servant and MP Francis Capel Harrison, CSI. Harrison was educated in England at the Rugby School and graduated from Oxford University in 1900 with an honours degree in Chemistry. In 1907, Harrison moved to the United States as Vice President of the Susquehanna Smelting Company, which moved to Lockport, New York, where Harrison founded the Harrison Radiator Company (predecessor to Harrison Radiator Corporation) in 1910. Harrison Radiator operated as an independent supplier to the growing American automotive industry until sold to Alfred P. Sloan's United Motors Company in 1917. United Motors was acquired one year later by its largest customer, General Motors. Harrison continued as President of the company until his death in London in 1927. The company became Delphi Thermal Systems in 1999, but was repurchased by General Motors as part of its components holding company in October 2009. Today it makes radiators and air conditioners.

On November 17, 1900, Harrison married Florence Maria Kemp in London, England, and they had three sons: Arthur Brydges Branfill Harrison, Charles Aylett Harrison and John H Harrison. Following his death, Mrs. Harrison remained in Lockport and married the Rev. Henry (Harry) Zwicker, rector of Grace Church, Lockport, New York.
