= Alexander Parkes =

English engineer, metallurgist and inventor (1813–1890)

- Born: 29 December 1813; Suffolk Street, Birmingham, England
- Died: 29 June 1890 (aged 76)
- Engineering career
- Projects: Parkesine

Alexander Parkes (29 December 1813 – 29 June 1890) was a metallurgist and inventor from Birmingham, England. He created Parkesine, the first man-made plastic.

== Biography ==
The son of a manufacturer of brass locks, Parkes was apprenticed to Messenger and Sons, brass founders of Birmingham, before going to work for George and Henry Elkington, who patented the electroplating process. Parkes was put in charge of the casting department, and his attention soon began to focus on electroplating. Parkes took out his first patent (No. 8905) in 1841 on a process for electroplating delicate works of art. His improved method for electroplating fine and fragile objects, such as flowers, was granted a patent in 1843. The process involved electroplating an object previously dipped in a solution of phosphorus contained in bisulphide of carbon, and then in nitrate of silver. A spider's web, silver-plated according to this method, was presented to Prince Albert when he visited the Elkington works in 1844.

In total Parkes held at least 66 patents on processes and products, mostly related to electroplating and to the development of plastics.

- In 1846, he patented the cold cure process for vulcanizing rubber, called by Thomas Hancock "one of the most valuable and extraordinary discoveries of the age".
- He pioneered the addition of small quantities of phosphorus to metals and alloys, and developed phosphor-bronze (patent 12325 of 1848, taken out jointly with his brother Henry Parkes).
- In 1850, he developed and patented the Parkes process for economically desilvering lead, also patenting refinements to the process in 1851 and 1852.
- In 1856, he patented Parkesine – the first thermoplastic – a celluloid based on nitrocellulose treated with a variety of solvents. This material, exhibited at the 1862 International Exhibition in London, anticipated many of the modern aesthetic and utility uses of plastics.
- In 1866, he set up The Parkesine Company at Hackney Wick, London, for bulk low-cost production. It was not commercially successful, however, for Parkesine was expensive to produce, prone to cracking and highly flammable. The business closed in 1868.
- Parkes' material was developed later in improved form as Xylonite by his associate Daniel Spill, who brought a patent infringement lawsuit – ultimately unsuccessful – against John Wesley Hyatt, developer of celluloid in the US. In 1870, however, the judge ruled that Parkes was the true inventor, owing to his original experiments.

== Personal and family details ==
Alexander Parkes was born at Suffolk Street, Birmingham, the fourth son of James Mears Parkes and his wife Kerenhappuch Childs. Samuel Harrison, described by Sir Josiah Mason as the inventor of the split-ring (or key-ring) and widely credited with the invention of the steel pen, was his great-uncle. Parkes was twice married. By his first marriage, to Jane Henshall Moore (1817–50), he had four sons and two daughters (the cricketer Howard Parkes was a grandson), and by his second marriage, to Mary Ann Roderick (1835–1919), four sons and seven daughters. The elder surviving son of his second marriage, Alexander Parkes junior, sometime President of the Association of Certified and Corporate Accountants, presented many original specimens of Parkesine to the Science Museum in 1937, the core of the museum's Parkesine collection.

Parkes' younger brother Henry (1824–1909), a trained chemist, who was married to Fanny Roderick (1837–97), a sister of Alexander's second wife, assisted him in many of his experiments during a collaboration lasting more than fifty years.

It is believed that the Parkes family descends from the Rev. Michael Parkes, Vicar of Penkridge, Staffordshire (died 1617), and had close connections with the metal-working towns of Wednesbury and Wolverhampton in the 16th, 17th and 18th centuries.

== Legacy ==
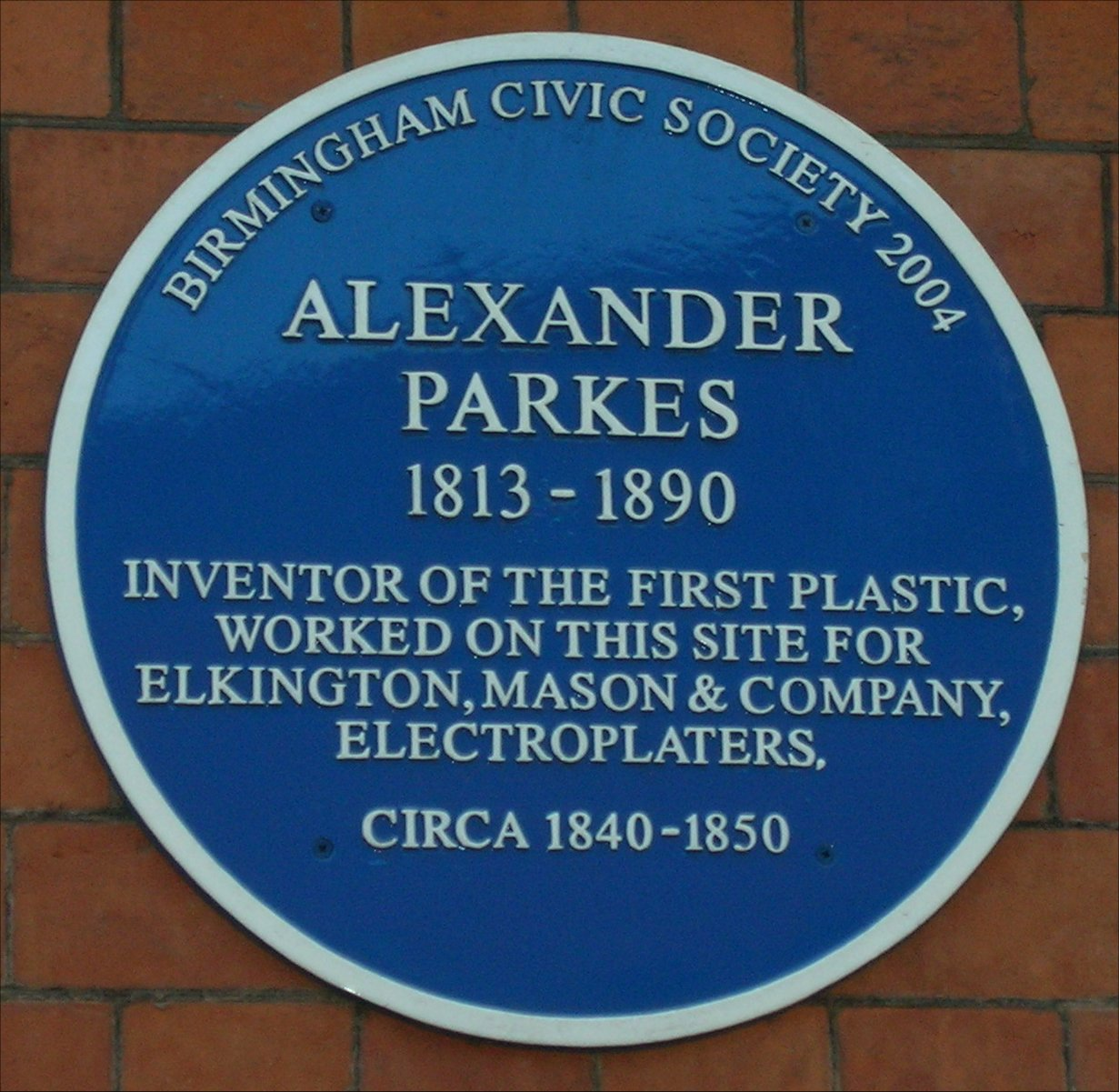
Blue plaque on the old Birmingham Science Museum

Parkes is remembered in several locations:

- The Plastics Historical Society placed a blue plaque on his home in Dulwich, London, in 2002;
- The Birmingham Civic Society erected a blue plaque commemorating him in 2004 on the original Elkington Silver Electroplating Works (the old Science Museum), Newhall Street, Birmingham;
- There is also a plaque on the wall of the site of the Parkesine Works.

In September 2005, Parkes was posthumously inducted into the American Plastics Academy's Hall of Fame. He is buried in West Norwood Cemetery, London, although his memorial was removed in the 1970s.
