= Celluloid =

Class of highly reactive materials produced by mixing nitrocellulose and camphor

Celluloids are a class of materials produced by mixing nitrocellulose and camphor, often with added dyes and other agents. Once much more common for its use as photographic film before the advent of safer methods, celluloid's common present-day uses are for manufacturing table tennis balls, musical instruments, combs, office equipment, fountain pen bodies, and guitar picks.

== History ==
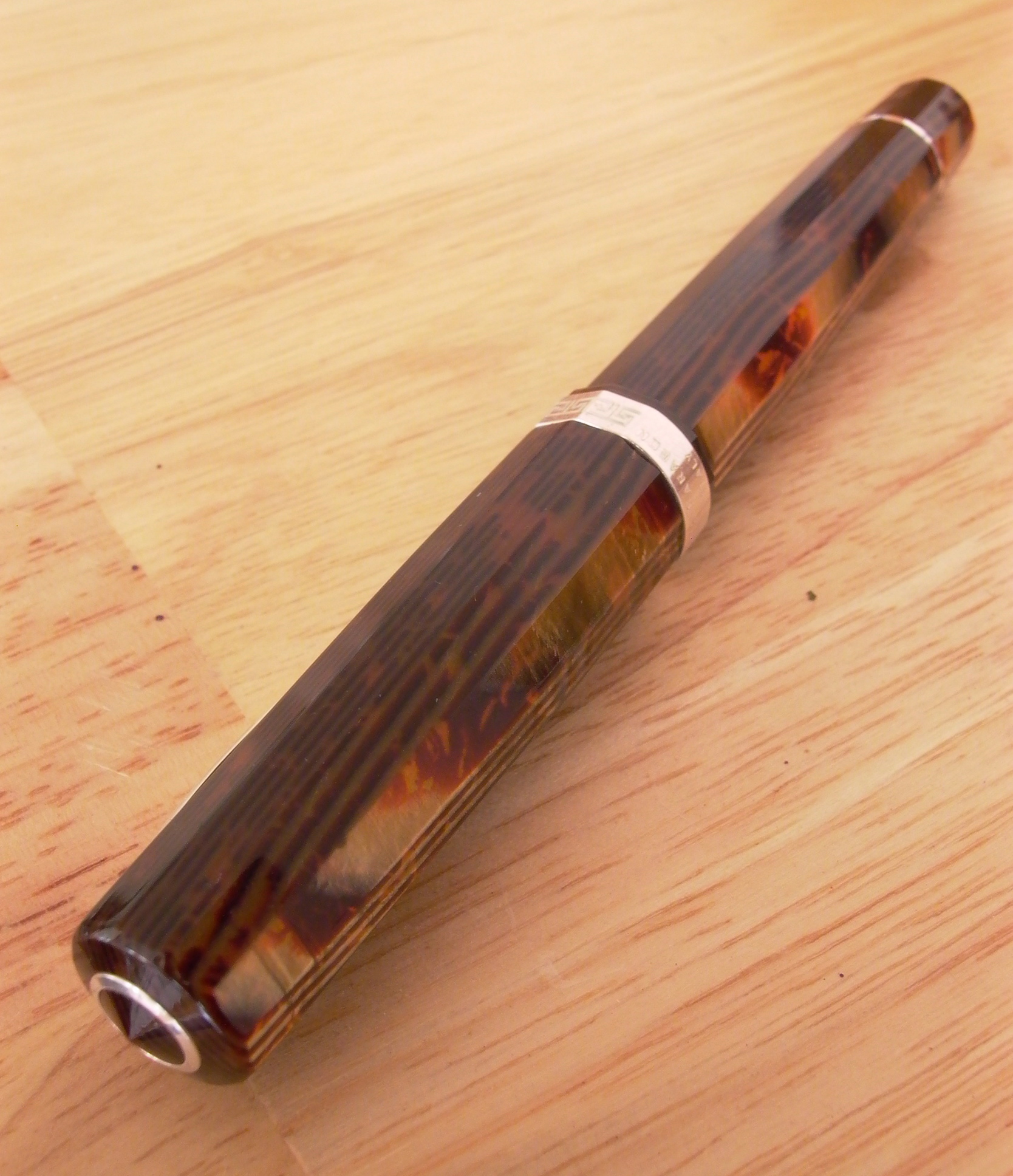
Celluloid and sterling silver pen.

=== Nitrocellulose ===
Nitrocellulose-based plastics slightly predate celluloid. Collodion, invented in 1846 and used as a wound dressing and an emulsion for photographic plates, is dried to a celluloid like film.

=== Alexander Parkes ===
The first celluloid as a bulk material for forming objects was made in 1855 in Birmingham, England, by Alexander Parkes, who was unable to benefit from his invention's later, more widespread success, after his firm went bankrupt due to scale-up costs. Parkes patented his discovery as Parkesine in 1862 after realising a solid residue remained after evaporation of the solvent from photographic collodion.

Parkes patented it as a clothing waterproofer for woven fabrics in the same year. Later Parkes showcased Parkesine at the 1862 International Exhibition in London, where he was awarded a bronze medal for his efforts. The introduction of Parkesine is generally regarded as the birth of the plastics industry. Parkesine was made from cellulose treated with nitric acid and a solvent. The Parkesine company ceased trading in 1868. Pictures of Parkesine are held by the Plastics Historical Society of London. There is a plaque on the wall of the site of the Parkesine Works in Hackney, London.

=== John Wesley Hyatt ===
In the 1860s, an American, John Wesley Hyatt, acquired Parkes's patent and began experimenting with cellulose nitrate with the intention of manufacturing billiard balls, which until that time were made from ivory. He used cloth, ivory dust, and shellac, and on April 6, 1869, patented a method of covering billiard balls with the addition of collodion. With assistance from Peter Kinnear and other investors, Hyatt formed the Albany Billiard Ball Company in Albany, New York, to manufacture the product. In 1870, John and his brother Isaiah patented a process of making a "horn-like material" with the inclusion of cellulose nitrate and camphor. Alexander Parkes and Daniel Spill (see below) listed camphor during their earlier experiments, calling the resultant mix "xylonite", but it was the Hyatt brothers who recognized the value of camphor and its use as a plasticizer for cellulose nitrate. They used heat and pressure to simplify the manufacture of these compounds. Isaiah Hyatt dubbed the material "celluloid" in 1872. The Hyatts later moved their company, now called the Celluloid Manufacturing Company, to Newark, New Jersey.

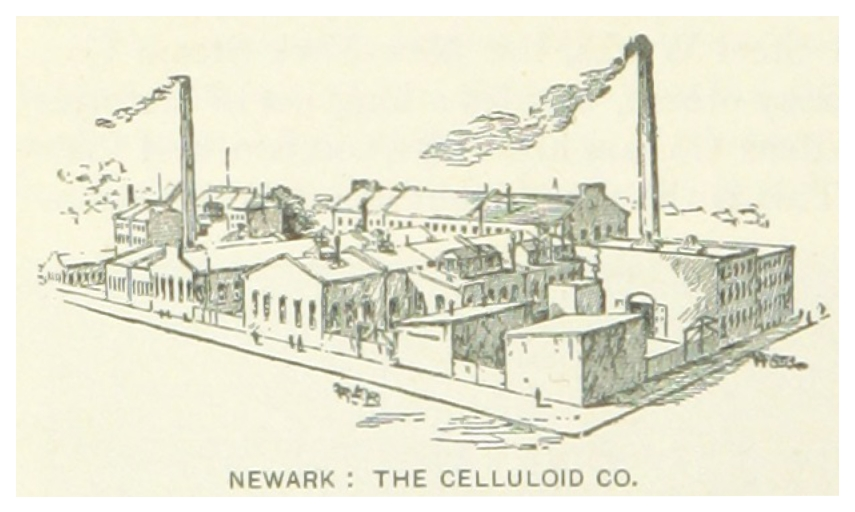
Newark, New Jersey, industrial production complex of the Celluloid Company (c. 1890)

Over the years, celluloid became the common use term used for this type of plastic. In 1878, Hyatt was able to patent a process for injection moulding thermoplastics, although it took another fifty years before it could be realized commercially, and in later years celluloid was used as the base for photographic film.

=== Imitating ivory ===
The development of celluloid was partially spurred by the desire to reduce reliance on ivory, with its shortages caused by overhunting. An 1883 invention allowed celluloid manufacturers to imitate the distinctive graining of ivory, and by the end of 19th century celluloid was marketed as a lighter (and three times cheaper) ivory substitute under the names "Ivarine", "Ivaleur", "French Ivory", "Parisian Ivory", "Grained Ivory", and "Ivory Pyralin".

=== Daniel Spill and legal disputes ===
English inventor Daniel Spill had worked with Parkes and formed the Xylonite Co. to take over Parkes' patents, describing the new plastic products as Xylonite. He took exception to the Hyatts' claims and pursued the brothers in a number of court cases between 1877 and 1884. Initially the judge found in Spill's favor, but ultimately it was judged that neither party held an exclusive claim and the true inventor of celluloid/xylonite was Alexander Parkes, due to his mention of camphor in his earlier experiments and patents. The judge ruled all manufacturing of celluloid could continue both in Spill's British Xylonite Company and Hyatt's' Celluloid Manufacturing Company.

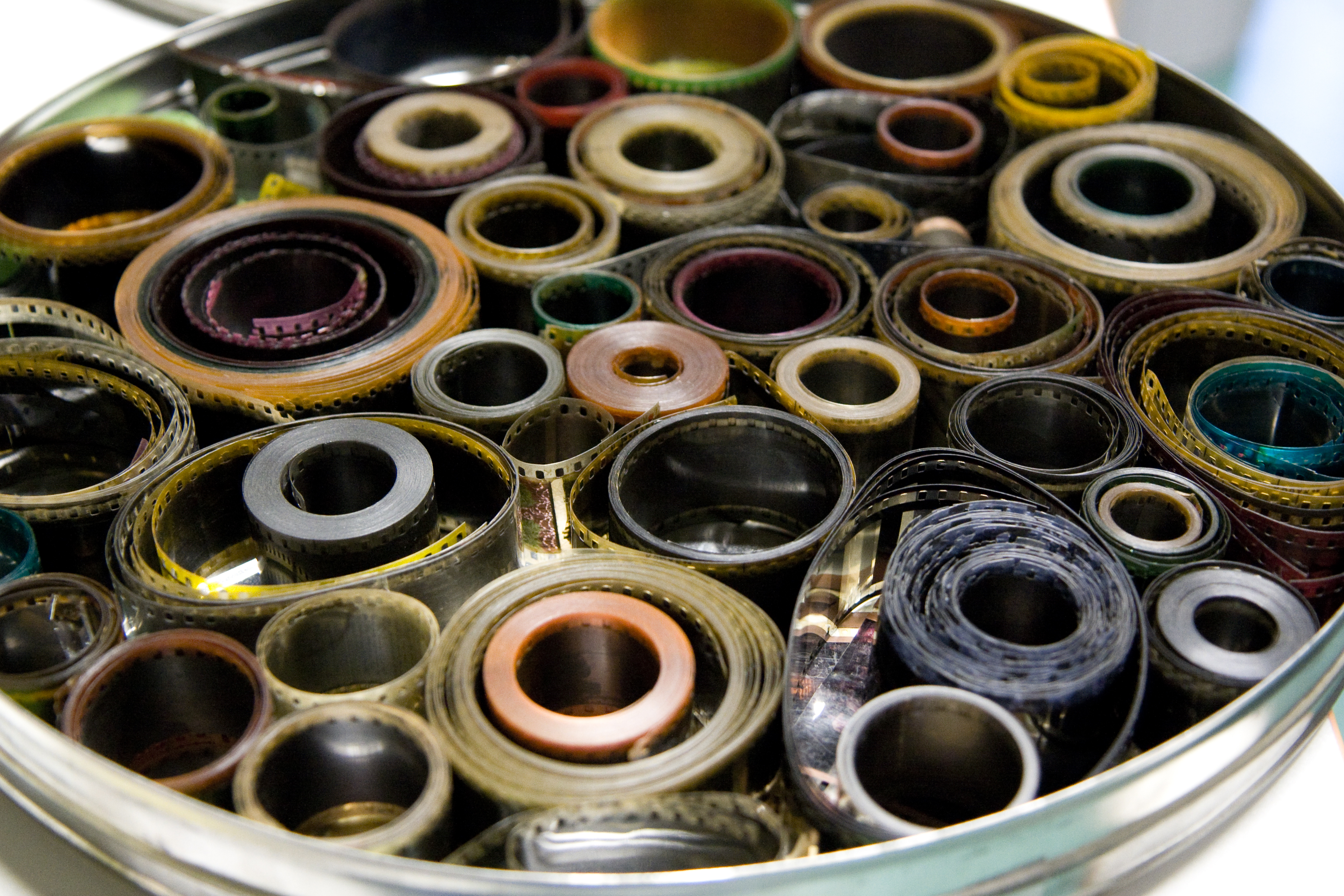
Old celluloid film rolls

The main use was in movie and photography film industries, which used only celluloid film stock prior to the adoption of acetate safety film in the 1950s. Celluloid is highly flammable, difficult and expensive to produce and no longer widely used.

== Photography ==
English photographer John Carbutt founded the Keystone Dry Plate Works in 1879 with the intention of producing gelatin dry plates. The Celluloid Manufacturing Company was contracted for this work, which was done by thinly slicing layers out of celluloid blocks and then removing the slice marks with heated pressure plates. After this, the celluloid strips were coated with a photosensitive gelatin emulsion. It is not certain exactly how long it took for Carbutt to standardize his process, but it occurred no later than 1888. A 15-inch-wide (380 mm) sheet of Carbutt's film was used by William Dickson for the early Edison motion picture experiments on a cylinder drum Kinetograph. However, the celluloid film base produced by this means was still considered too stiff for the needs of motion-picture photography.

By 1889, more flexible celluloids for photographic film were developed, and both Hannibal Goodwin and the Eastman Kodak Company obtained patents for a film product. (Ansco, which purchased Goodwin's patent after he died, was eventually successful in a patent-infringement suit against Kodak). This ability to produce photographic images on a flexible material (as opposed to a glass or metal plate) was a crucial step toward making possible the advent of motion pictures.

== Uses ==
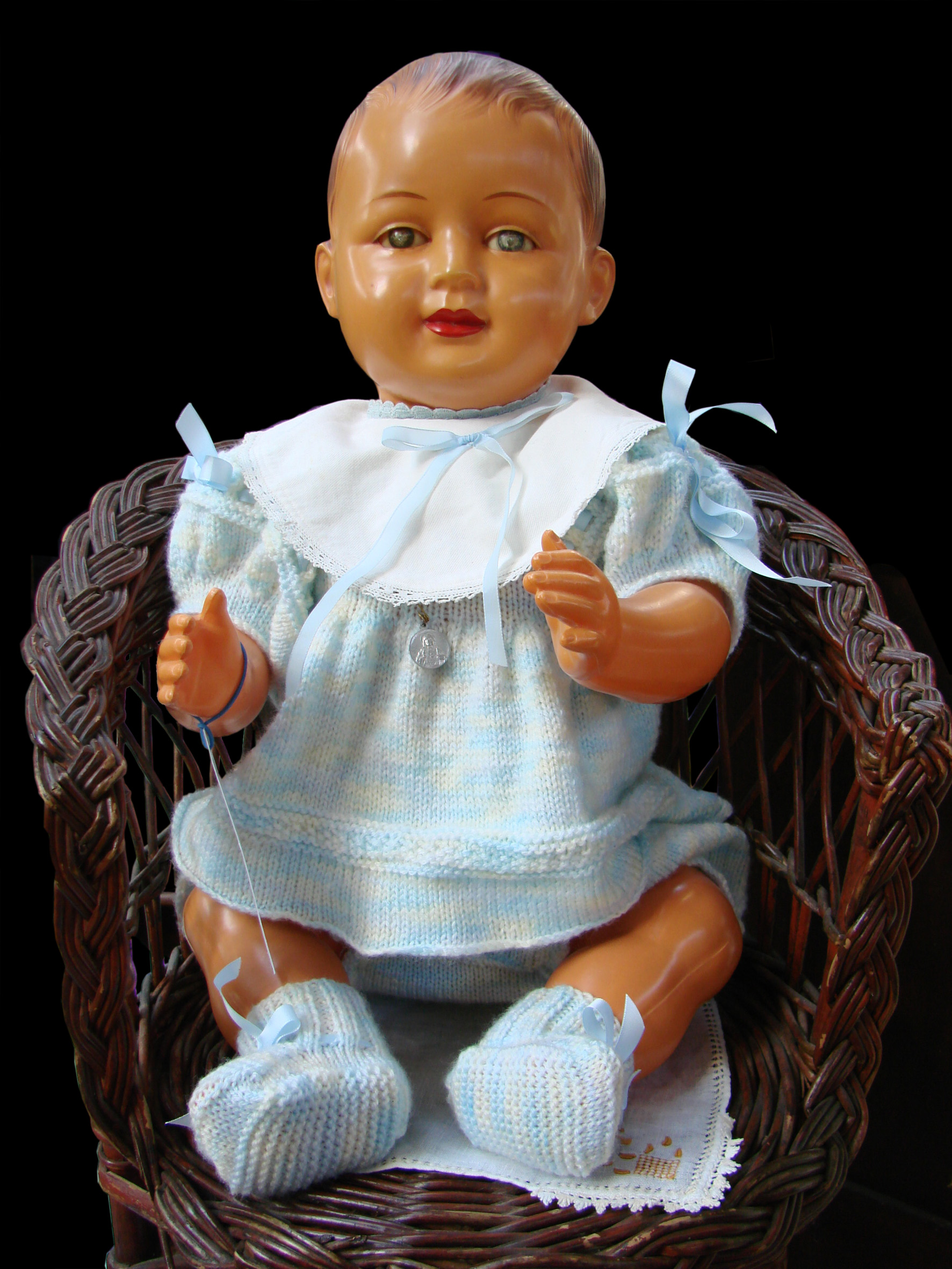
An antique celluloid doll

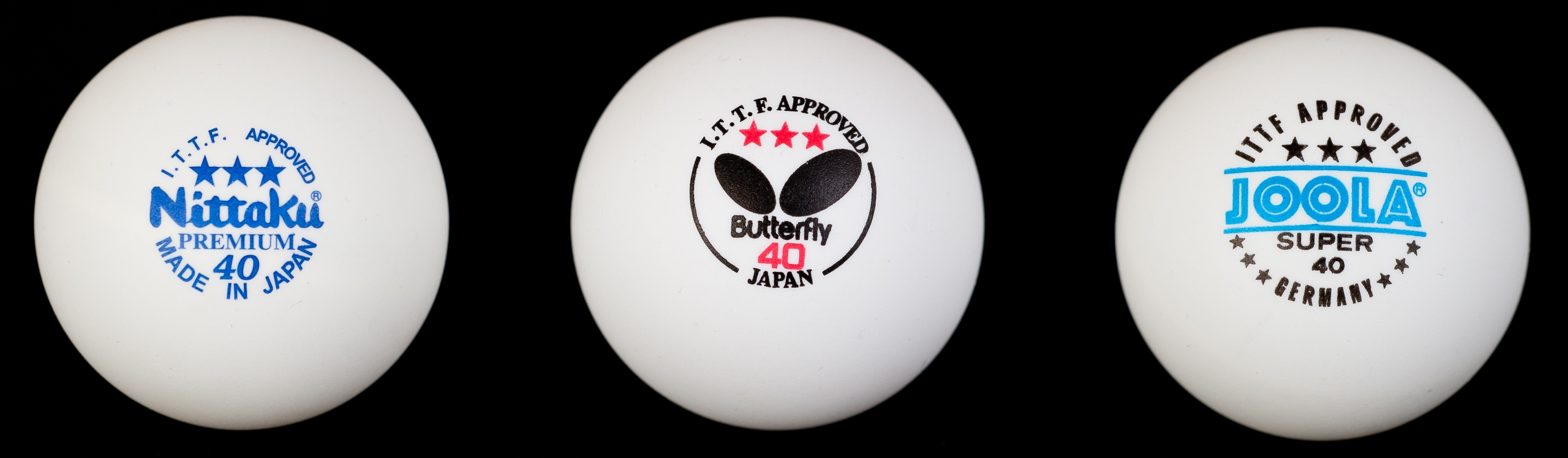
Table tennis balls

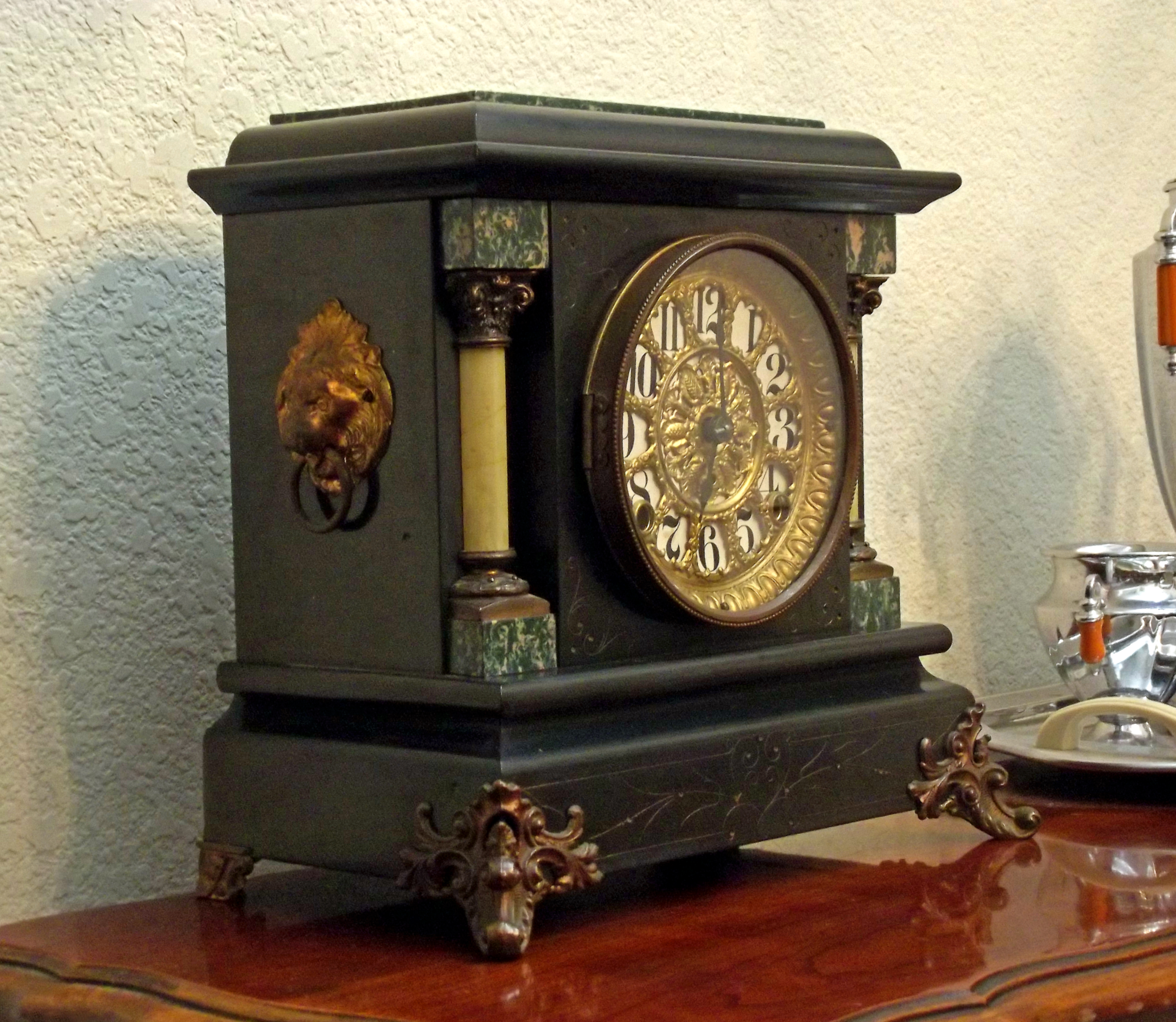
A Seth Thomas black mantel clock, a typical late 19th century American style. The "serpentine" and "stone" of the pillars are made of celluloid glued to wood.

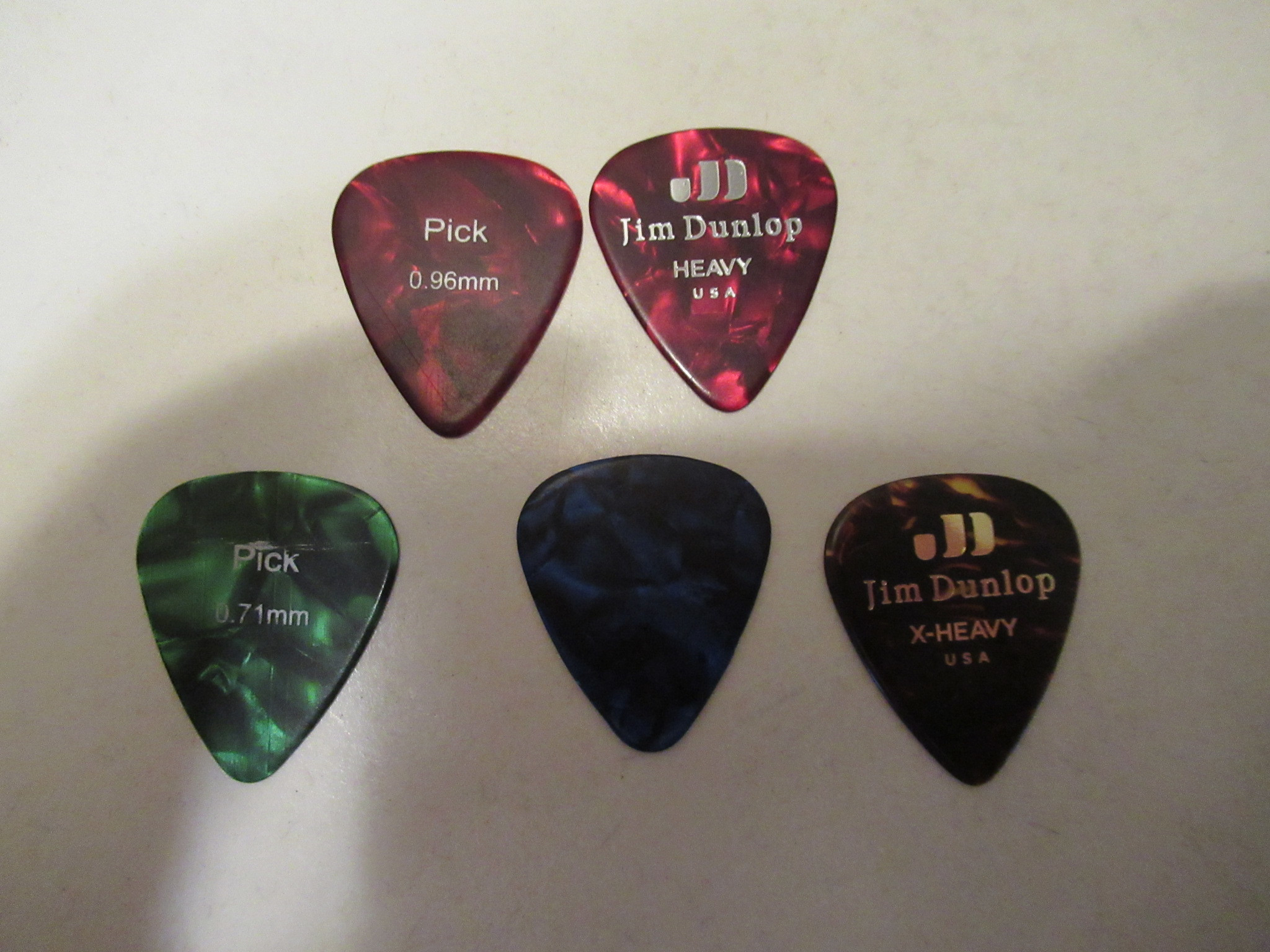
Assorted tortoiseshell celluloid guitar picks.

Most movie and photography films prior to the widespread move to acetate films in the 1950s were made of celluloid. Its high flammability was legendary since it self-ignites when exposed to temperatures over 150 °C in front of a hot movie-projector beam. While celluloid film was standard for 35mm theatrical productions until around 1950, motion-picture film for amateur use, such as 16mm and 8mm film, were on acetate "safety base", at least in the US.

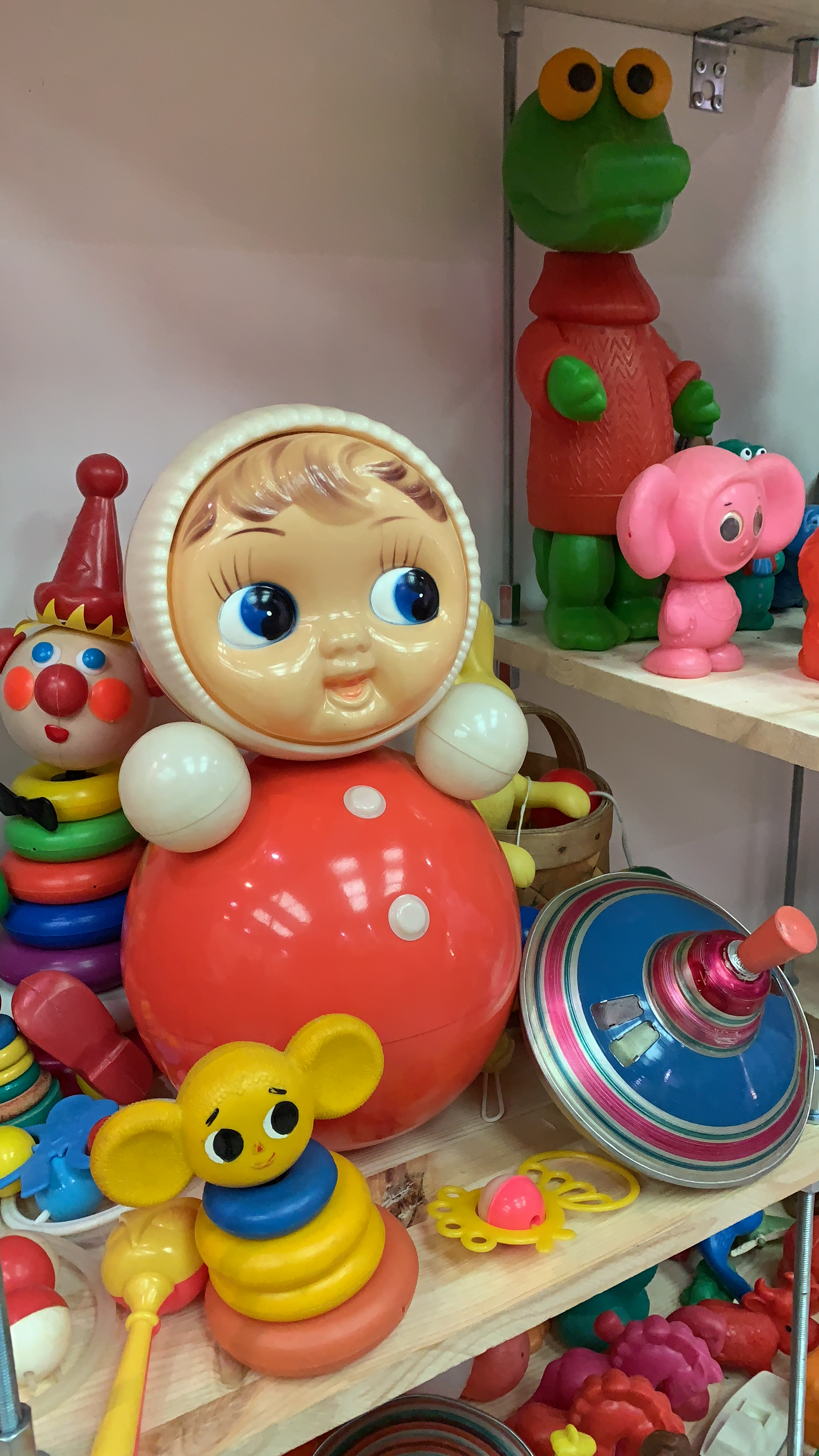
A late Soviet roly-poly toy made from celluloid

Celluloid was useful for producing cheaper jewellery, jewellery boxes, hair accessories and many items that would earlier have been manufactured from ivory, horn or other expensive animal products. In these applications it was often referred to as "Ivorine" or "French Ivory", after a form of celluloid developed in France with grain lines in made to resemble ivory. It was also used for dressing table sets, dolls, picture frames, charms, hat pins, buttons, buckles, stringed instrument parts, accordions, fountain pens, cutlery handles and kitchen items. The main disadvantage the material had was that it was flammable. It was soon overtaken by Bakelite and Catalin. Soviet roly-poly dolls were made from celluloid on smokeless powder plants until 1996, and table tennis balls until 2014. Parker Brothers made diabolos out of celluloid that owing to low friction of celluloid were said to spin "even faster than steel".

Shelf clocks and other furniture items were often covered with celluloid in a manner similar to veneer. This celluloid was printed to look like expensive woods, or materials like marble or granite. The Seth Thomas clock company bought rights for its use as a durable coating from Celluloid Manufacturing Company in September, 1880 and marketed it as, "Adamantine". Celluloid enabled clockmakers to make the typical late Victorian style of black mantel clock in such a way that the wooden case appeared to be black marble, and the various pillars and other decorative elements of the case looked like semi-precious stone.

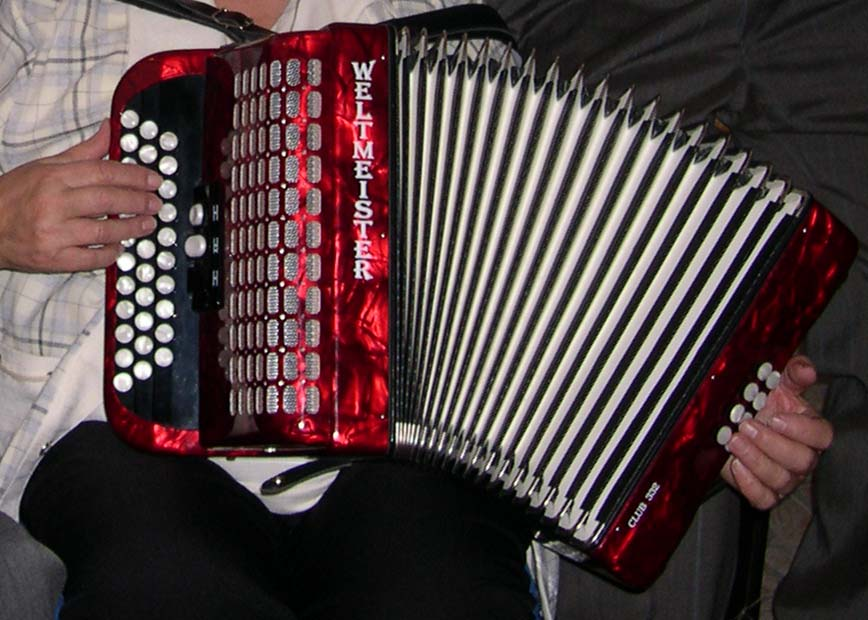
Flaming celluloid pattern on an accordion.

Celluloid was also a popular material in the construction of slide rules. It was primarily used to coat wooden slide rule faces, such as in early A.W. Faber rules, as well as cursor end pieces, such as in Keuffel and Esser rules.

Celluloid remains in use for musical instruments, especially accordions and guitars. Celluloid is very robust and easy to mold in difficult forms, and has great acoustic performance as cover for wooden frames since it does not block wood's natural pores. Instruments covered with celluloid can easily be recognized by the material's typical nacre-like flaming pattern. Thick celluloid panels are cooked in a bain-marie which turns them into a leather-like substance. Panels are then turned on a mold and allowed to harden for as long as three months.

== Production ==
Celluloid is made from a mixture of chemicals such as nitrocellulose, camphor, alcohol, as well as colorants and fillers depending on the desired product. The first step is transforming raw cellulose into nitrocellulose by conducting a nitration reaction. This is achieved by exposing the cellulose fibers to an aqueous solution of nitric acid; the hydroxyl groups (-OH) will then be replaced with nitrate groups (-ONO_{2}) on the cellulose chain. The reaction can produce mixed products, depending on the degree of substitution of nitrogen, or the percent nitrogen content on each cellulose molecule; cellulose nitrate has 2.8 molecule of nitrogen per molecule of cellulose. It was determined that sulfuric acid was to be used as well in the reaction in order to first, catalyze the nitric acid groups so it can allow for the substitution onto the cellulose, and second, allow for the groups to easily and uniformly attach to the fibers, creating a better quality nitrocellulose. The product then must be rinsed to wash away any free acids that did not react with the fibers, dried, and kneaded. During this time, a solution of 50% camphor in alcohol is added, which then changes the macromolecule structure of nitrocellulose into a homogeneous gel of nitrocellulose and camphor. The chemical structure is not well understood, but it is determined that it is one molecule of camphor for each unit of glucose. After the mixing, the mass is pressed into blocks at a high pressure and then is fabricated for its specific use.

Nitrating cellulose is an extremely flammable process in which even factory explosions are not uncommon. Many western celluloid factories closed after hazardous explosions, and only two factories in China remain in business.

== Environmental hazards ==
=== Deterioration ===
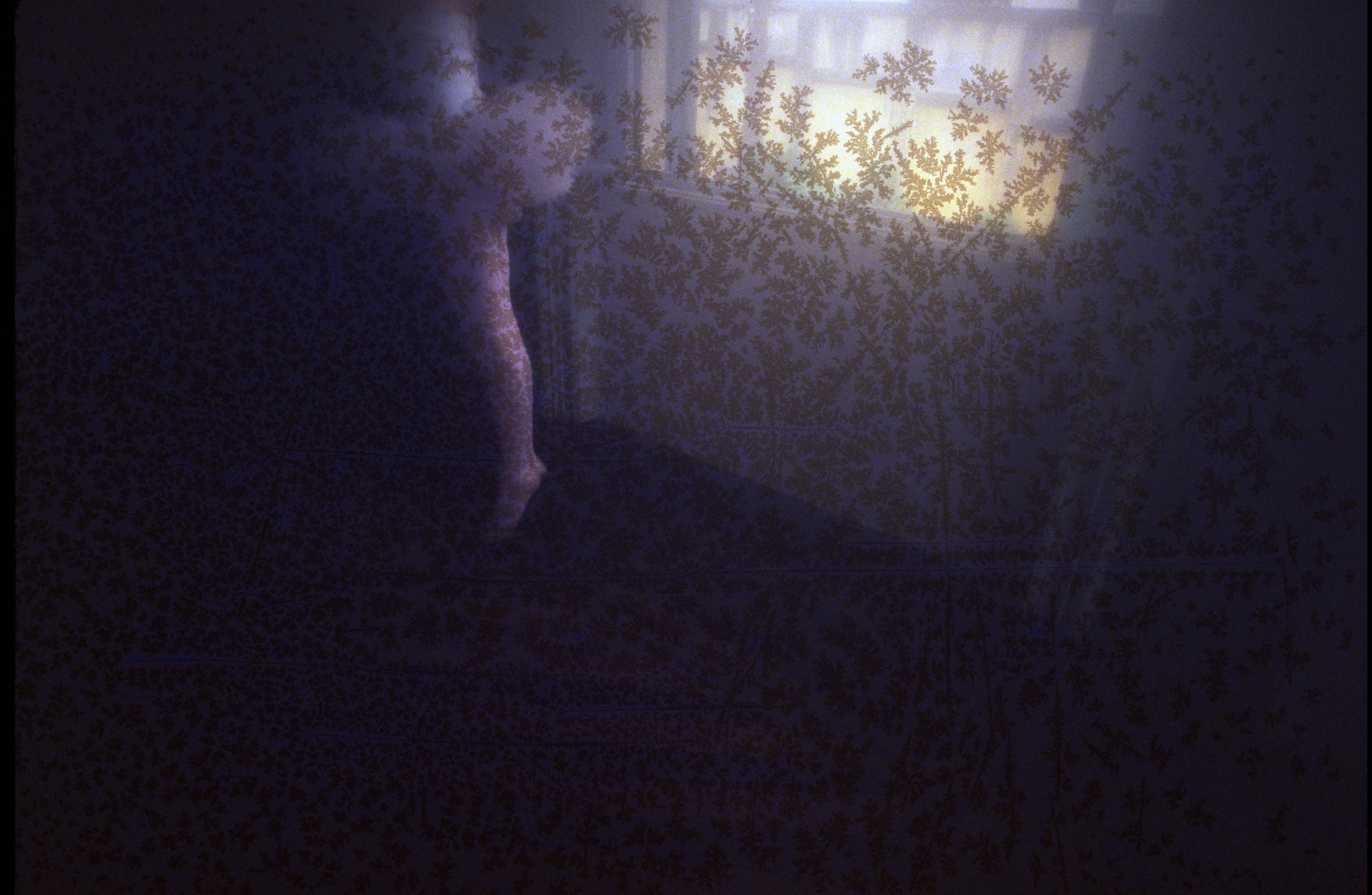
A fungus-damaged photographic slide

Many sources of deterioration in celluloid exist, such as thermal, chemical, photochemical, and physical. The most inherent flaw is as celluloid ages, the camphor molecules are ‘squeezed’ out of the mass due to the unsustainable pressure used in the production. That pressure causes the nitrocellulose molecules to bind back to each other or crystallize, and this results in the camphor molecules being shoved out of the material. Once exposed to the environment, camphor can undergo sublimation at room temperature, and the plastic reverts to brittle nitrocellulose. Also, with exposure to excess heat, the nitrate groups can break off and expose nitrogen gases, such as nitrous oxide and nitric oxide, to the air.

Another factor that can cause this is excess moisture, which can accelerate deterioration of nitrocellulose with the presence of nitrate groups, either newly fragmented from heat or still trapped as a free acid from production. Both of these sources allow the accumulation of nitric acid. Another form of deterioration, photochemical deterioration, is severe in celluloid because it absorbs ultraviolet light well. The absorbed light leads to chain-breakage and stiffening.

Among collectors of antiques, the deterioration of celluloid is generally known as "celluloid rot." The chemical processes involved are not perfectly understood, but it is widely believed that the gases released by a piece undergoing celluloid rot can trigger celluloid rot in nearby articles of celluloid which were previously intact.

== See also ==
- Cel
- Green eyeshade

== Sources ==
- Beaujot, Ariel (2012), ""The Real Thing": The Celluloid Vanity Set and the Search for Authenticity", Victorian Fashion Accessories, Bloomsbury Publishing Plc, pp. 139–178, doi:10.2752/9781472504517/Beaujot0006, ISBN 9781472504517
