= Hyatt Roller Bearing Company =

Company in New Jersey, United States

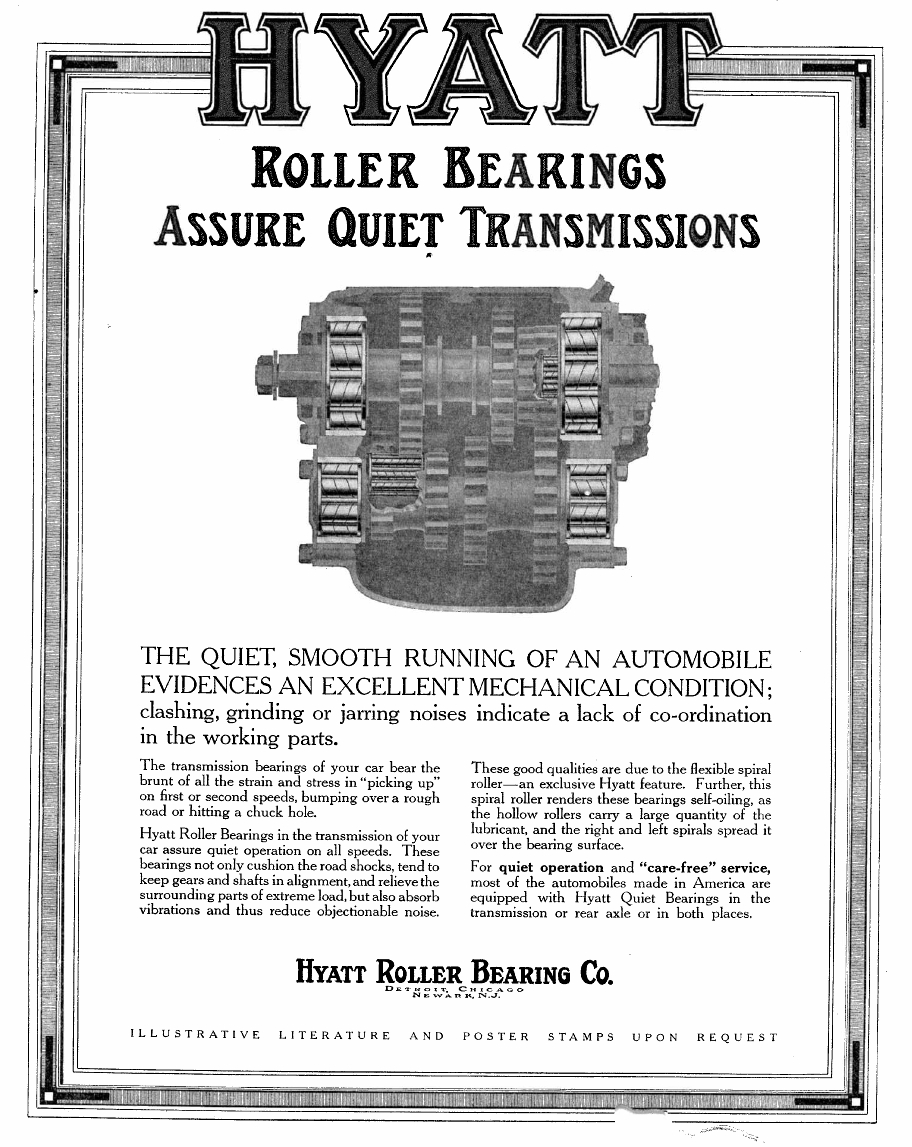
- Advertisement from The Saturday Evening Post of 5 June 1915
- Industry: Roller Bearings
- Founded: Harrison, New Jersey, 1892
- Founder: John Wesley Hyatt
- Defunct: 1916
- Fate: Acquired by General Motors
- Headquarters: United States
- Key people: Alfred P. Sloan
- Products: Roller bearings

Hyatt Roller Bearing Company was a manufacturer of roller bearings from 1892 to 1916, when it was acquired by General Motors. It continued as a distinct division of GM for many years. The company struggled at first, then entered a phase of profitable growth under the leadership of Alfred P. Sloan (later president of General Motors). The innovative design of Hyatt's roller bearings made them more durable and efficient than others. They were widely used in early automobiles by various manufacturers, and in industrial vehicles and equipment.

== Foundation ==
John Wesley Hyatt was a printer by trade and a prolific inventor who secured over 250 patents, the first issued in 1861 for a knife grinder. His chemical experiments led to the invention of celluloid.

In 1888 he was working on a mill for crushing sugar cane, but lacked adequate bearings. His solution was a roller bearing where the rollers were made from coiled strips of steel, which he patented. The helical-shaped rollers made from flat spring steel were more flexible than solid-cylinder rollers, did not heat up and lock due to friction, and lasted longer. Later Hyatt introduced refinements, with the bearings assembled within a closed cage.

Seeing broad potential for the invention, he founded the Hyatt Roller Bearing Company in 1892. The company was originally based in Newark, New Jersey, but soon moved to Harrison, New Jersey.

== Early years ==
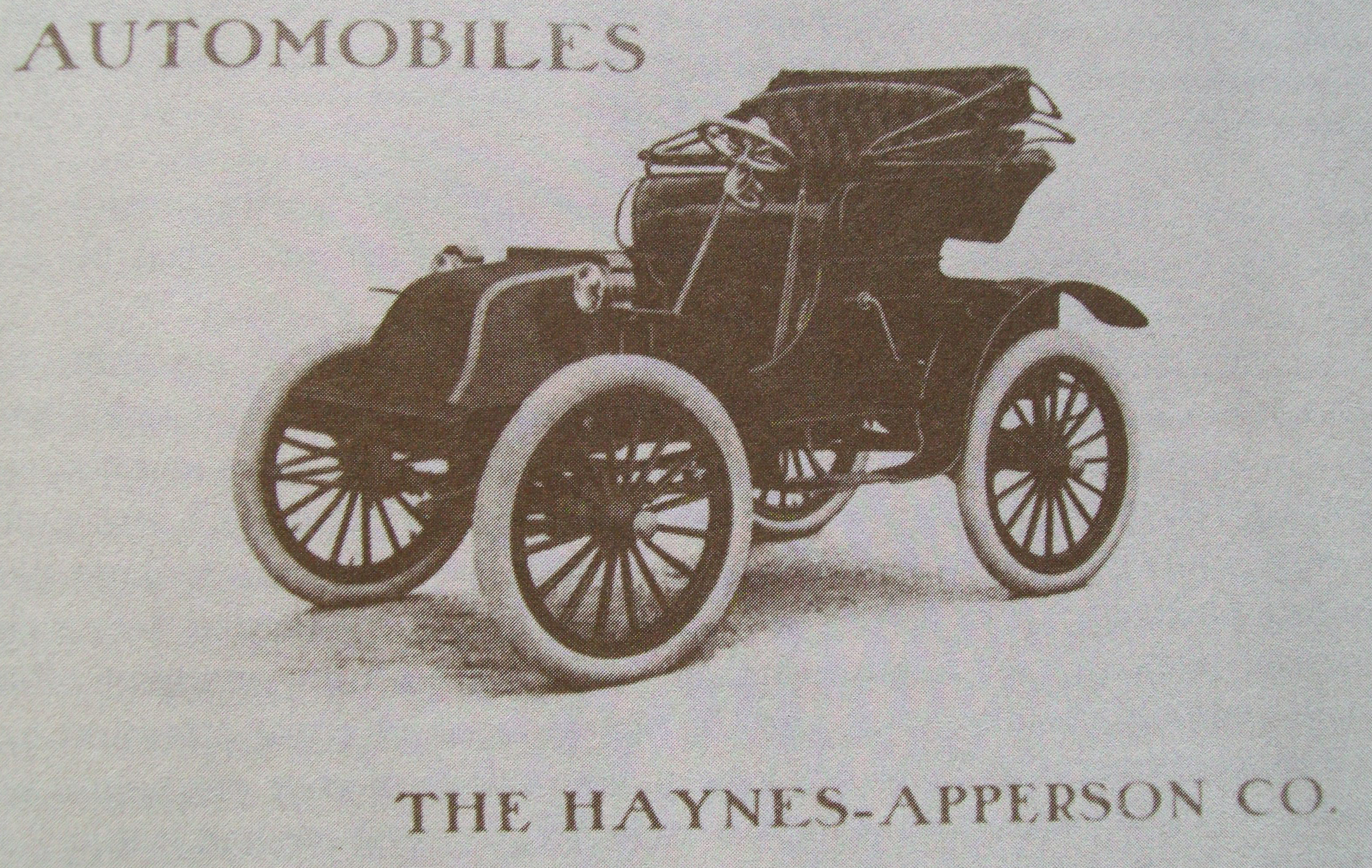
A 1903 advertisement for a Haynes-Apperson car

In 1895 the company had about 25 employees and sold about $2,000 of roller bearings each month. That year Hyatt hired the 20-year-old Alfred P. Sloan as a draftsman. Sloan had recently obtained a degree from the Massachusetts Institute of Technology. He had been struggling to find a job, and was recommended to Hyatt by John E. Searles, president of the American Sugar Refining Company, a friend of his father and a major investor in Hyatt.

Sloan wrote later,

Well, I am bound to admit the first sight of my opportunity was disappointing... Not far from a city dump on a weed-grown, marshy plain was an old weather-worn building, like an overgrown barn. In its indefinite yard there was a small mound of coal and a great mound of reddish-gray cinders and ashes; also a disorderly accumulation of discarded machinery ... Once the factory had been painted brown. Only one word describes it: "dirty." Smoke from the dump carried an acric odor. Eventually across the wall nearest the railroad track there was lettered in black this legend: HYATT ROLLER BEARING COMPANY.

Although the company was mismanaged and financially insecure, Sloan saw that the spirally-wound flexible roller bearing product had real potential. At that time industrial parts were not machined precisely, so the flexibility of the Hyatt bearing was a valuable quality. However, Sloan left Hyatt in 1897 to take a better-paying job with which he could afford to marry his fiancée, Irene Jackson. He joined another start-up company named Hygienic Refrigerator, which was trying to develop an electric refrigerator.

Hyatt bearings for automobiles were first produced in 1896 for use in the Haynes-Apperson car of Elwood Haynes.

== Expansion ==
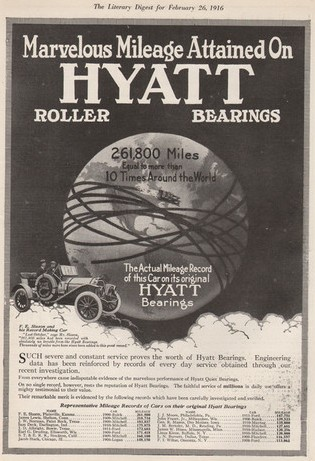
Advertisement in The Literary Digest of 26 February 1916

In 1899 John Searles, the largest investor in Hyatt, decided to cut his losses. Sloan's father joined forces with another investor to buy out Searles for $5,000. They gave Sloan the job of turning the company around, with a six-month deadline. Sloan became general manager in charge of production. The company bookkeeper, Pete Steenstrup, was made sales manager. Under the new discipline imposed by Sloan and Steenstrup the company made a profit of $12,000 in the first six months, more than exceeding expectations.

In the summer of 1900 the company received a breakthrough order of 120 bearings for the rear axles of 30 automobiles from the Olds Motor Works of Ransom E. Olds. The Olds Motor Works had plans to build over 1,000 vehicles in 1901, and would use Hyatt bearings if the test vehicles were successful. Sloan was appointed president of Hyatt in 1901, and oversaw rapid and profitable growth of the company. Sloan and his family invested over $50,000 in the company. Hyatt moved to new premises and became a large, modern industrial operation. Sloan was awarded patents for shafting hangers and hanger boxes, and for improvements to these inventions.

Sloan learned an important lesson early in his tenure from Henry M. Leland, general manager of Cadillac, then an independent company. Leland refused to accept the first shipment of Hyatt's bearings since they were not accurate to within 0.001 inches (0.025 mm). Given the importance of the contract for immediate revenue and for Hyatt's reputation as a quality supplier, Sloan at once travelled to Detroit to discuss the problem. At first Sloan defended his products, but then listened as Leland forcibly explained the importance of uniform precision in automobile parts. He said "Mr. Sloan, Cadillacs are made to run, not just to sell." Sloan now asked for Leland's advice. He later said, "I was determined to be as fanatical as he in obtaining precision in our work. An entirely different standard had been established for Hyatt Roller Bearings."

Soon Hyatt bearings were used in axles and transmissions by a number of manufacturers. Hyatt supplied bearings to the Covert Motor Vehicle Company, founded by B. V. Covert, who also co-founded the Harrison Radiator Company. Later Sloan would bring Harrison Radiator into the United Motors Company. Hyatt supplied bearings to the Lincoln Steel and Forge Company for use with the axles of coal mine car frames, Lincoln's highly successful main product. Henry Ford became a major customer. By 1916 the Ford Motor Company had almost half the market for new automobiles, selling 577,036 vehicles that year. Hyatt also became a critical supplier of bearings to component manufacturers who supplied General Motors.

James D. Mooney, later to become head of General Motors Overseas, was hired by Hyatt and worked there before enrolling in the army in 1917 during World War I.

== General Motors subsidiary ==
In 1916 General Motors purchased Hyatt for $13.5 million as part of a drive by William C. Durant, co-founder and president of General Motors, to bring key suppliers in-house.

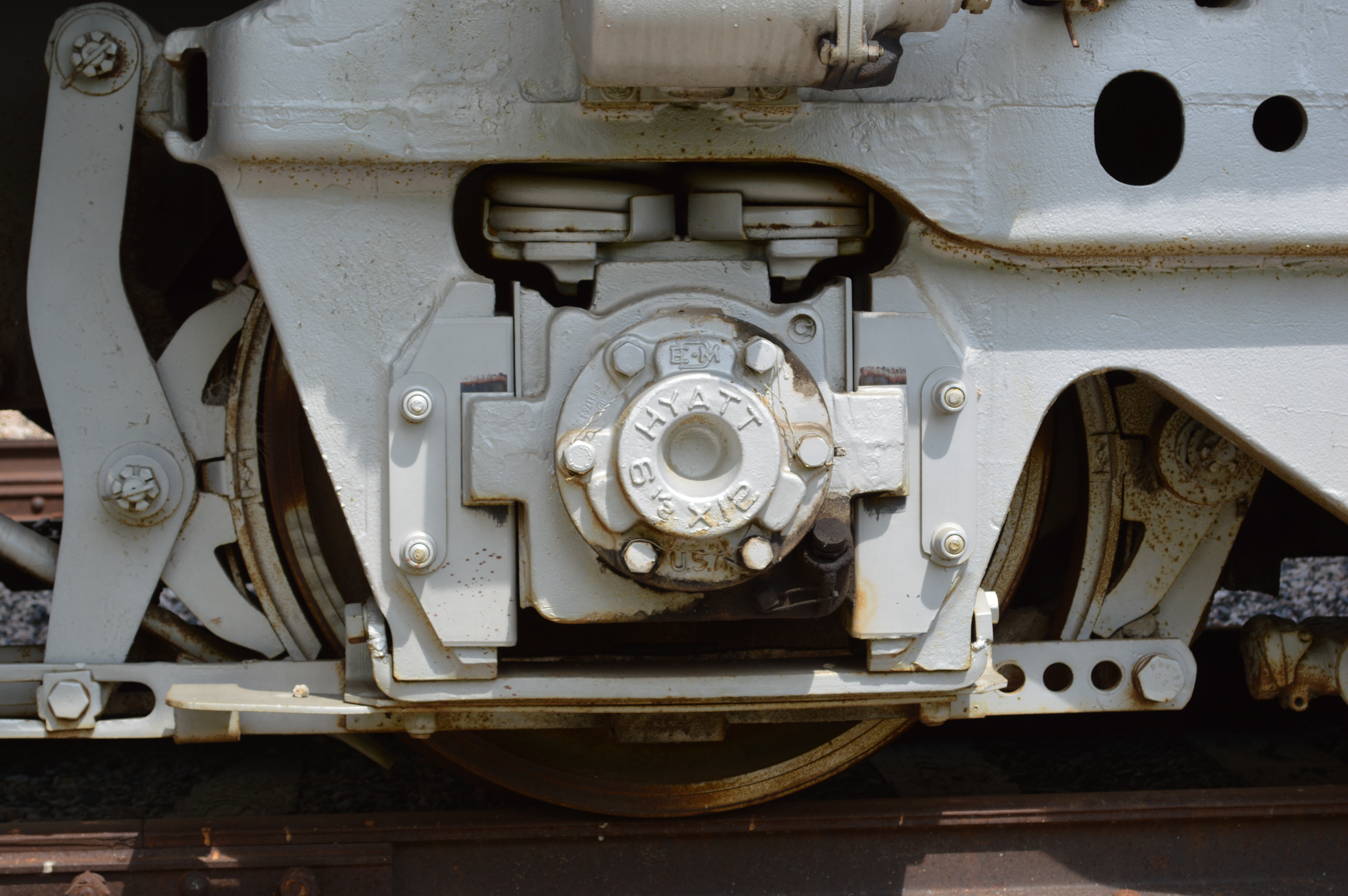
A Hyatt bearing on a GM-EMD locomotive

Other suppliers were acquired at this time and assembled in the "United Motors" parts and accessories company with Alfred Sloan as president. They were Hyatt, New Departure Manufacturing (bearings), Westom-Mott Axle, Remy Electric Company, Periman Rim Company, and Dayton Engineering Laboratories. United Motors was merged into General Motors in 1918. Sloan would become president of GM in 1923.

As of 1934 Hyatt Roller Bearings were being used in industrial equipment for mining, oil fields, textiles, steel mills, road building, power transmission, farm machinery and railroad cars as well in automobiles. The New Departure Division and the Hyatt Bearing Division were merged into the New Departure-Hyatt Bearing Division in 1965. In October 1987, General Bearing purchased Hyatt Bearing from General Motors. In 1986 this division stopped making commercial ball bearings but continued to manufacture high-precision bearings for aircraft engines. After further divisional mergers, bearing manufacture ceased in 1993. As of 2013 the Hyatt brand was owned by General Bearing Company of New York- a division of SKF bearing company.

== Sources ==
- Bowman, Bill (2013). "Hyatt Roller Bearing Company". Archived from the original on 2018-05-16.
- Bulletin: Technical series. Vol. 7 (3 ed.). School of Mines and Metallurgy, University of Missouri. 1924.
- Carey, Charles W. (2009-01-01). American Inventors, Entrepreneurs, and Business Visionaries. Infobase Publishing. ISBN 978-0-8160-6883-8.
- Farber, David (2002-11-15). Sloan Rules: Alfred P. Sloan and the Triumph of General Motors. University of Chicago Press. ISBN 978-0-226-23804-3.
- Pelfrey, William (2006-03-27). Billy, Alfred, and General Motors: The Story of Two Unique Men, a Legendary Company, and a Remarkable Time in American History. AMACOM Div American Mgmt Assn. ISBN 978-0-8144-2961-7.
- Pound, Arthur (1934). The Turning Wheel; the Story of General Motors Through Twenty-Five Years, 1908-1933. Doubleday, Doran. ISBN 978-1-290-38174-1.
- "The James D. Mooney Papers". Georgetown University. Archived from the original on 2013-10-20.
