= John Wesley Hyatt =

American inventor of plastic

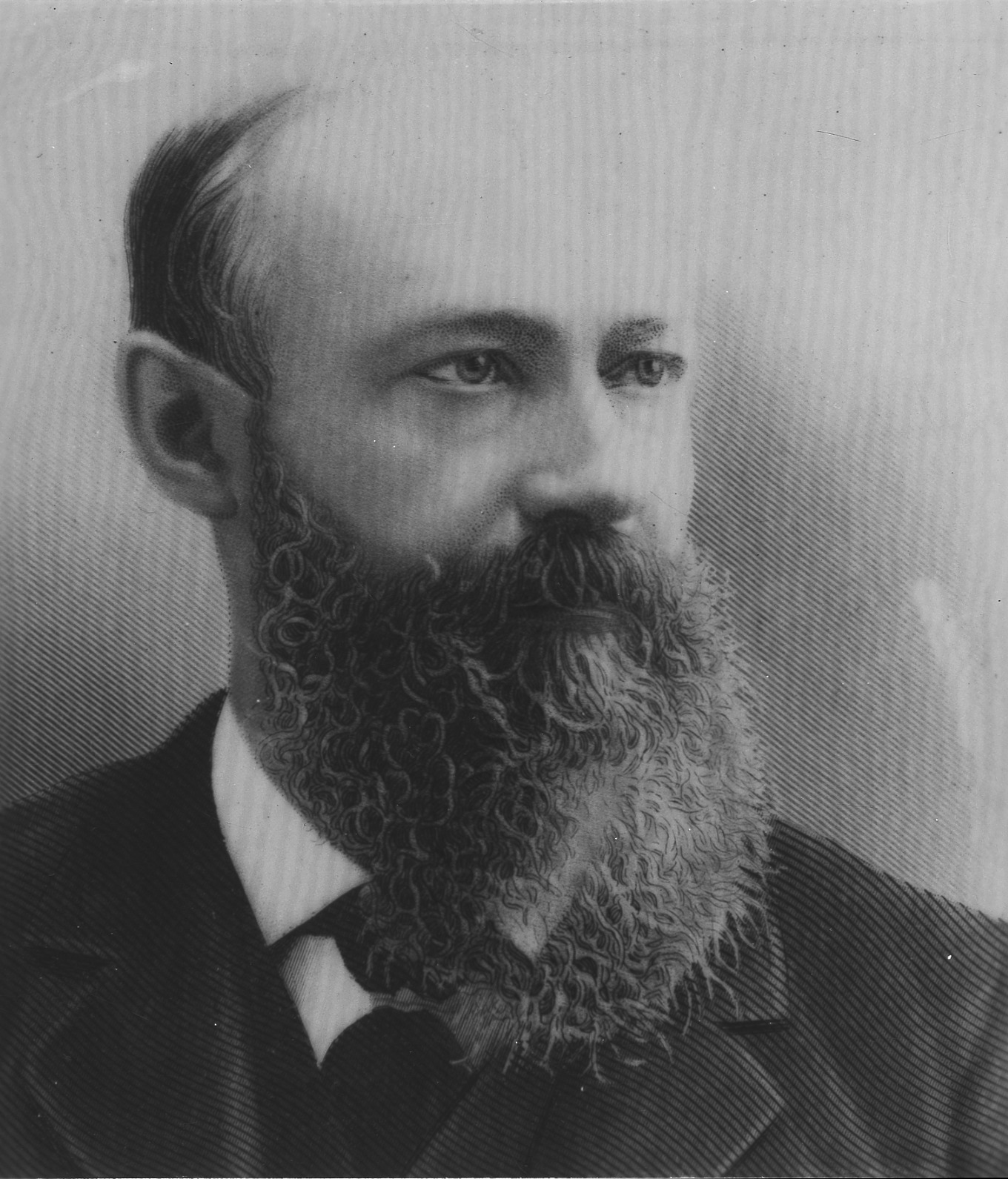
- Hyatt in the 1890s
- Born: November 28, 1837; Starkey, New York
- Died: May 10, 1920 (aged 82)
- Engineering career
- Projects: production of celluloid
- Awards: John Scott Medal (1898); Perkin Medal (1914)

John Wesley Hyatt (November 28, 1837 – May 10, 1920) was an American inventor. He is known for simplifying the production of celluloid.

Hyatt, a Perkin Medal recipient, is included in the National Inventors Hall of Fame. He had nearly 238 patents to his credit, including improvements to sugar cane mills and water filtration devices.

== Biography ==
Hyatt was born in Starkey, New York, and began working as a printer when he was 16. Later, he invented a simpler celluloid production process, receiving several hundred patents. Among the most well-known of his inventions was that of a substitute for ivory to produce billiard balls. An award of $10,000 had been instituted by Michael Phelan in 1863 due to the cost of ivory and concerns on its shortage.

Aided by his brother Isaiah, Hyatt experimented with Parkesine, a hardened form of nitrocellulose. Parkesine had been invented by the Englishman Alexander Parkes in 1862, and is considered the first true plastic, although it was not a success as a commercial or industrial product.

Liquid nitrocellulose, or collodion, had been used as early as 1851 by another English inventor, Frederick Scott Archer, in photographic applications; it had also been used extensively as a quick-drying film to protect the fingertips of printers. Hyatt's eventual result was a commercially viable way of producing solid, stable nitrocellulose, which he patented in the United States in 1869 as "Celluloid" (US patent 50359; now a genericized trademark).

In 1870, Hyatt formed the Albany Dental Plate Company to produce, among other things, billiard balls, false teeth, and piano keys. Hyatt’s Celluloid Manufacturing Company was established in Albany, New York in 1872 and moved to Newark, New Jersey, in 1873.

Hyatt's celluloid discovery went into court in a patent dispute with English inventor, Daniel Spill, who had patented essentially the same compound in the UK as "Xylonite". Spill and Hyatt clashed in court between 1877 and 1884. The eventual decision was that the true inventor of celluloid was Parkes, but that all manufacturing of celluloid could continue, including Hyatt's.

Hyatt's other patented inventions include the first injection moulding machine, sugarcane milling, juice extraction, roller bearings, and a multiple-stitch sewing machine. Hyatt was inducted into the Plastics Hall of Fame in 1974.

John Wesley Hyatt founded the Hyatt Roller Bearing Company in 1892 in Harrison, New Jersey. The company's customers included General Motors and the Ford Motor Company. In 1895 he hired Alfred P. Sloan, son of a major investor in the company, as a draftsman. In 1905 he made Sloan president. The company was sold to General Motors in 1916, and Sloan went on to become president of GM.
