= Defender Photo Supply =

Defender Photo Supply was an early leader in manufacturing of black & white sheet film, plates, printing paper, and instructional books. Incorporated in 1899 in Rochester, New York, it was purchased by DuPont in 1945. A branch of the company, The Defender Dry Plate Company, was located in Wayne Junction, Germantown, Philadelphia, PA. The two company branches issued combined trade catalogs.

== Achievements ==
- Defendol - an affordable developing agent created to sidestep developers controlled by German patents
- Chromatone Process - Introduced in 1935, is a method of using a collodion stripping paper manufactured by the Defender Company and tricolor toners developed by Francis H. Snyder and Henry W. Rimbach of New York City.
- VC Paper
