= Collodion-albumen process =

The Collodion-Albumen process is one of the early dry plate processes, invented by Joseph Sidebotham in 1861.

The process lacked economical success because the plate was much less sensitive (about 1/4) and tended to have harder contrasts than wet plates. While the first was acknowledged by Sidebotham, the latter were disputed by him indicating the fact that the 1860 gold medal for the best landscape photography was made with a Collodion-Albumen plate (Recreative Science, 1861 P 43).

== Process ==
There are several compounds unstable to light in this mixture, mainly silver iodine and silver bromide. These decompose and leave silver that is oxidized by the developer (Pyrogallic Developing Solution). The excess of silver iodine and silver bromide are stabilized by the fixing bath. The albumen mixture just encloses the Collodion in a dry environment.

== Sources ==
- The Collodio-Albumen Process of Photography, Joseph Sidebotham (London : Recreative Science Vol II 1861)
- History of Photography, Josef Maria Eder (Dover Publications, Mineola, NY, 1945)
