= Daniel Spill =

British businessman

Daniel Spill (11 February 1832 – 1887) was born in Winterbourne, Gloucestershire, England. He became a rubber and an early thermoplastics manufacturer. For over 20 years Spill had pursued the goal of making a successful business from Alexander Parkes' invention Parkesine, the first man-made plastic.

== Career ==
Although he trained as a doctor he joined the business of his brother George. The firm of George Spill & Co. manufactured waterproof textiles in Stepney Green, East London by spreading rubber onto cloth. The material was much in demand for capes and groundsheets for soldiers in the wet conditions of the Crimean War.

Spill became aware of Parkes' claim for the waterproof qualities of Parkesine probably at the 1862 exhibition. Negotiations led to an agreement not only to use it for waterproofing but also to develop Parkesine in the works of George Spill at Hackney Wick. A provisional patent was granted in 1863 to the Spill brothers and Thomas James Briggs concerning "improvements in the manufacture of driving straps or bands and of flexible tubes or hose"

In 1866, the Parkesine Company was established with Daniel Spill as works manager and Parkes as managing director. The Company did not prosper and was wound up in 1868, Spill taking over most of the stock. He formed the Xylonite Company in 1869 to carry on the business but that did not fare much better and was wound up in 1874.

Undaunted by these failures, Spill established Daniel Spill & Co. in Homerton, continuing to make Xylonite and Ivoride. This enterprise succeeded in that others entered into an agreement with Spill in 1877 to form the British Xylonite Company in purpose-built premises at Brantham. This company did go on and prosper, going on to employ 1,160 people by 1902 and changed its name to BX Plastics.

Spill's later years were largely occupied in a long legal battle in America with John Wesley Hyatt and the Celluloid Manufacturing Company for infringement of his patents. The lawsuit which was filed in 1875, was first found in his favour in 1880 even after Parkes testified on behalf of Hyatt, but reversed in 1884. Spill returned to England and in 1887 died of diabetes at the age of 55.

== Personal life ==
He married at the age of 18; his bride was 15. In 1881 Spill was listed as a retired manufacturer in the 1881 census of Leyton High Street, living with his wife and daughter and his nephew George, an India Rubber Manufacturer.
