= Plastics Historical Society =

The Plastics Historical Society (PHS) was formed in 1986 and aims to encourage the study of all historical aspects of plastics and other polymers, including synthetic fibres, rubber and elastomers. It is an independent society, affiliated to the Institute of Materials, Minerals and Mining and is based in London.

== Sources ==
- PHS website
