= Olivier Voinnet =

French biologist (born 1973)

Olivier Voinnet (born 1972) is a French biologist and professor of RNA biology at the ETH Zurich. Voinnet obtained his PhD in 2001 in England in the group of David Baulcombe and later obtained a position as an independent group leader at the CNRS in Strasbourg where he was promoted to Directeur de Recherche in 2005. In 2010, he moved to ETH Zurich where he was appointed a full professor of RNA Biology. Voinnet's published articles have been subject to allegations of image manipulation, leading to multiple corrections and retractions: as of 2022 nine of Voinnet's scientific articles have been retracted, five others have received an expression of concern, and 25 others have been corrected.

== Investigations of scientific misconduct ==
In 2015, Voinnet's work was investigated for image manipulation. The investigation at ETH Zurich found that the scientist "breached his duty of care in the handling of figures as well as in his supervisory duties as a research director...and will receive an admonition in relation to his conduct," but also concluded that "this is not a case of scientific misconduct as defined in ETH Zurich's Rules of Procedure". Another, independent investigation by CNRS established "the existence of deliberate chart/diagram manipulations, in breach of the ethical standards applicable to the presentation of scientific results," but such "inappropriate presentation of experimental data...does not amount to fabrication."

== Bans, suspensions ==
In July 2015, Voinnet was suspended from the CNRS (the French National Centre for Scientific Research) for 2 years. In January 2016 the SNSF (the Swiss National Science Foundation) terminated Voinnet's funding, and banned him from additional funding for three years.

== Awards ==
In 2009 Voinnet was awarded the EMBO Gold Medal. The European Molecular Biology Organization (EMBO) retracted the award in 2016. In 2009 he was also awarded the "Grand Prix scientifique de la Fondation Louis D." of the Institut de France.

In 2013 he was awarded the Rössler Prize at the ETH Zurich, sponsored by Max Rössler. This prize is awarded each year to a young professor from ETH Zurich, considered to be of the ″most promising young scientists in the further development of their career″.

== See also ==
- List of scientific misconduct incidents

== Links ==
- Voinnet, Olivier – Voinnet's page at the ETH Group of RNA Biology website

=== Peer reviews retractions ===
- PubPeer – Results for Olivier Voinnet on PubPeer
- Archive for the ‘olivier voinnet’ Category on Retraction Watch

=== Inquiries ===
==== Articles, discussions ====
- Troubled plant-biology group faces new inquiry – Team of leading biologist Olivier Voinnet chalks up eighth retraction, by Declan Butler, Nature, 14 October 2016
- French, Swiss bodies to probe possible research fraud, Phys.org, September 8, 2016
- Funding Ban for Plant Biologist – Olivier Voinnet, who has corrected and retracted several papers, cannot receive Swiss government grants for three years, by Kerry Grens, The Scientist, January 26, 2016
- The “Voinnet Case”: Incorrect Measures for Incorrect Figures? – Formal investigations by the ETH Zürich and the French CNRS identified numerous incorrect figures in about twenty publications by plant biologist Olivier Voinnet. Nevertheless, he is to keep his laboratory and professorship at the ETH. Hard to understand, as many colleagues express their astonishment, Lab Times, July 12, 2015
- The Voinnet case – Suspension for two years at the CNSR and an “admonition” at ETH Zürich! , by Seraya Maouche, Ethics and Integrity, July 10, 2015 (updated: August 1, 2015)
- Leading plant biologist found to have committed misconduct – CNRS researcher Olivier Voinnet suspended for two years after manipulated images discovered in his work, by Declan Butler, Nature, 10 July 2015

==== Press releases ETH, CHRS ====
- Conducted properly – published incorrectly, Press release, ETH News, 10 July 2015
- Completion of the procedure against Olivier Voinnet, Press release, CNRS, 10 July 2015

=== Early years (CV early years) ===
- Finding His Voice in Gene Silencing, by Elisabeth Pain, in Career Profiles, Science, May. 29, 2009
