= Grand Prix scientifique de la Fondation Louis D. =

- Awarded for: Award for fundamental or applied research in the STEM area
- Sponsored by: Institut de France
- Country: France
- Reward: €450,000
- First award: 1999
- Website: The Louis D. Foundation

The Grand Prix scientifique de la Fondation Louis D. (Scientific Grand Prize of the Louis D. Foundation) is an award conferred annually by the Louis D. Foundation of the Institut de France. It is awarded for fundamental or applied research in the areas of the science, technology, engineering, and mathematics. Each year the prize has a different theme. The award has a €450,000 prize.

== Laureates ==
Winners of the prize are:

Year	Winner(s)
2024	Vincent Guedj
2023	Gideon Grader
2022	Philippe Mendels
2021	Ana-Maria Lennon-Duménil
2020	Jean-Luc Beuzit, Anthony Boccaletti, Gael Chauvin, Thierry Fusco, Maud Langlois and David Mouillet
2018	Raphaël Rodriguez
2017	Tatiana Giraud
2016	François Labourie and Marcelo Viana
2015	Chris Bowler and Didier Raoult
2014	François Bouchet
2013	Thibault Cantat
2012	Philippe Bouyer and Christophe Salomon
2011	Geneviève Almouzni and Philip Avner
2010	Frank Dimroth
2009	Hervé Vaucheret and Olivier Voinnet
2008	Yves Frégnac
2007	Albert Osterhaus and Sir John Skehel
2006	Jean-Louis Martin and Manuel Joffre
2005	David P. Bartel and Ronald Plasterk
2004	Jean-Claude Duplessy
2003	Denils Le Bihan and Stanislas Dehaene
2002	Harmut Wekerle
2001	Margaret Pericak-Vance
2000	Pasteur Institutes and Associated Institutes for the fight against tuberculosis and malaria.
