= ERMETH =

Early Swiss-built computer

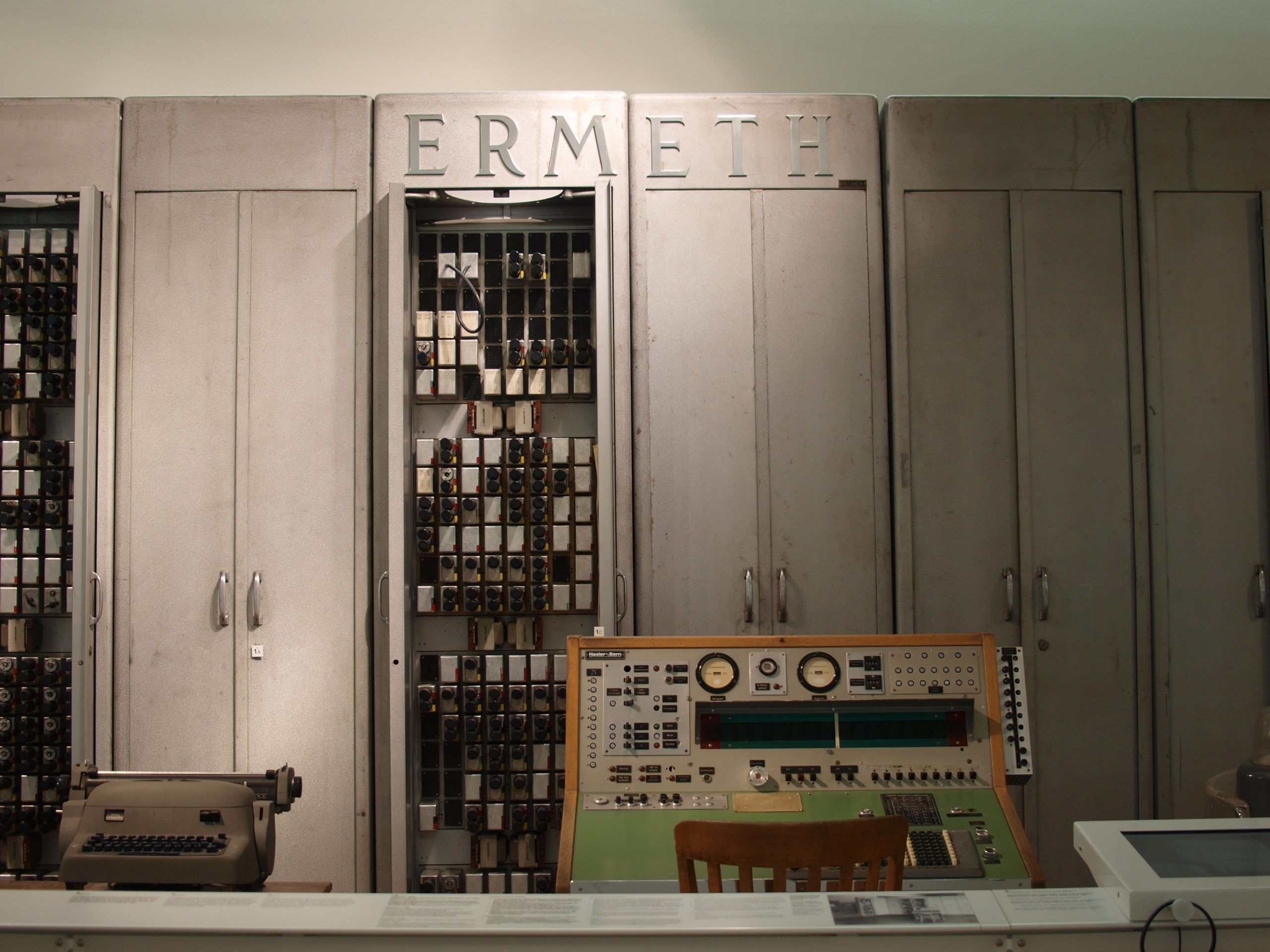
The ERMETH at the Museum of Communication Bern

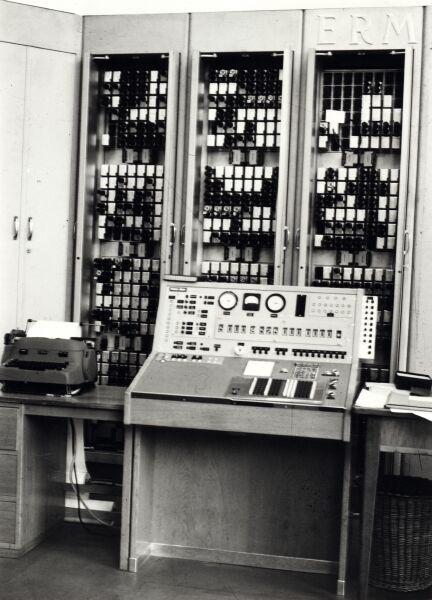
The ERMETH

The ERMETH (Elektronische Rechenmaschine der ETH, German for Electronic Calculating Machine of the ETH) was one of the first computers in Europe and was developed and built by Eduard Stiefel and his team of the Institute for Applied Mathematics at the ETH Zurich between 1948 and 1956. It was in use until 1963 and is now displayed at the Museum of Communication Bern (Switzerland).

== Models ==
Eduard Stiefel and his two senior assistants Heinz Rutishauser and Ambros Speiser were inspired by models in the USA and United Kingdom when developing the ERMETH. In 1949 Rutishauser and Speiser undertook study trips to Howard Aiken (Harvard University), John von Neumann (Princeton University) and to the University of Cambridge, which operated the EDSAC. In 1950, Stiefel rented for five years the only existing digital computer in continental Europe at that time, the Zuse Z4, completed by Konrad Zuse in 1945, for the ETH in order to gain experience with a calculating machine during the construction of the ERMETH.

== Technical concept ==
The ERMETH had (in contrast to the Z4) a classical von Neumann architecture, i.e. it was a calculating machine in which program and processed data were stored in the same main memory; thus, numbers, as well as program parts, could be processed automatically. The ERMETH was designed for numerical calculations and worked in true decimal (not binary or hexadecimal) and had instructions for all four basic arithmetic operations with floating-point and fixed-point numbers, but not for processing letters. At the start of operation (1956), it consisted of devices (hardware) and stored user programs (software), but had no operating system, so that each user had to first read in his program, which had already been prepared on punch cards in machine language and then start it by setting the program counter to the first command. Under program control, user data was then read in (from punch cards) and parameter values were requested (via the keyboard) from the user.

Already in 1952, Heinz Rutishauser had presented the concept of the compiler for the use of machine-independent computer languages in his habilitation thesis on "automatic computation plan production". Thanks to the development of the higher programming language Algol (Algol 58 and Algol 60), machine-independent programming later became possible; for the input of letters, the ERMETH 1958 had to be supplemented with a paper tape reader.

The ERMETH had an arithmetic unit with 1,500 electron tubes. A 1.5-ton magnetic drum with space for 10,000 words to 16 decimal places (14 digits, sign, check digit), which rotated at 100 revolutions per second, served as the main memory. This also determined the operating speed of the ERMETH per command step, because the average access time to the commands and numbers stored on the drum was 5 milliseconds; the much higher operating speed of the electron tubes did not change this. The use of the 10'000 words of the working memory was very flexible. For each word (with 16 decimal places), either a floating-point number (11 valid digits, 3-digit exponent, sign and check digit), a fixed point number (14 digits, sign, check digit) or two instructions (2 digits for instruction type, 1 digit for index register, 4 digits for memory address) could be stored. An example: The compiler developed by Hans Rudolf Schwarz for Algol 60 programs occupied 4,000 memory cells with double instructions so that 6,000 cells remained available for an application program and its user data. If this was not enough, all 10,000 cells could be used, but only after overwriting the compiler. In this case, however, the compiler had to be reloaded before the next Algol program from punch cards, which alone took almost an hour.

For numerical data input, mainly punch cards of the type Remington-edge with 90 columns were used, later on also 5-channel punch tape for Algol program input. Data output was either on punched cards or on an IBM-typewriter, which, however, also output only digits. Thus, punched cards could also be used for intermediate storage of large amounts of data as secondary storage.

The electrical power consumption of the ERMETH was 30 kW. It reacted sensitively to fluctuations in the mains voltage, for example when the tram went into operation in the morning.

In 1955, Heinz Rutishauser became an associate professor at the ETH Zurich and Ambros Speiser left to the industry, becoming the founding director of the IBM Zurich Research Laboratory in Rüschlikon. From there on, the completion of the ERMETH was supervised by Peter Läuchli and Alfred Schai. With various technical and financial setbacks, the ERMETH was built up as a one-off unit from 1955 onwards and gradually put into operation from 1956 onwards; it performed its task until October 1963, when it was dismantled and packed. A planned licensed version of ERMETH by a private company did not come about. After spatial alterations a CDC 1604A of Control Data Corporation took its place from April 1964. The available computing power at ETH increased by a factor of 100 with the transition from the electromechanical Z4 to the ERMETH, but by a factor of 400 with the transition from the ERMETH with its time-critical magnetic drum memory to the fully electronic CDC 1604A.

== Deployment ==
The ERMETH has been used in research and development for very different tasks. The employees of the Institute of Applied Mathematics used it for their own scientific topics to develop numerical algorithms and working aids in the sense of first operating system components. But they were also active as consultants and helpers for computing work of other ERMETH users. They came from the ETH and other universities as well as from industry and from civil and military federal agencies.

The ERMETH was also used in teaching. Optional programming lectures were held from the 1950s onwards, and there were also exercises (in groups) on the computer system. If students had written a program and transferred it to punched cards, they could hand in their punched card package and, depending on the program quality, received the expected or a wrong result or even a program abort printed out the next day.

== ERMETH today ==
After its dismantling in 1963, the ERMETH was stored for the time being as an important exhibit for the planned Technorama in Winterthur and then exhibited there from 1982 to 2004. Since the end of 2006, it has been on permanent loan from ETH Zurich to the Museum of Communication in Bern.

== See also ==
- Heinz Rutishauser. Automatische Rechenplanfertigung bei programmgesteuerten Rechenmaschinen, Mitteilungen aus dem Institut für angewandte Mathematik an der Eidgenössischen Technischen Hochschule in Zürich; Birkhäuser, Basel 1952.
- Ambros P. Speiser. ERMETH : Projekt einer elektronischen Rechenmaschine an der Eidgenössischen Technischen Hochschule in Zürich und bisherige Entwicklungsergebnisse. Verlag NZZ, Zürich 1954.
- Heinz Waldburger. Gebrauchsanleitung für die ERMETH (elektronische Rechenmaschine der ETH). Institut für angewandte Mathematik der ETH Zürich, 1960.
- Trueb, Lucien F. Ermeth - der selbstgebaute Computer der ETH Zürich. NZZ am Sonntag, 22./23. Dezember 2007, S. e17.
- Tobler, Beatrice. Z4 und ERMETH: Maschinen im Dienste des wissenschaftlichen Rechnens. Interview mit Ambros Speiser und Carl August Zehnder. In: Kommunikation, Museum für (Hg.): Loading History - Computergeschichte(n) aus der Schweiz. Bern 2001, S. 12–21.
