= Yves Frégnac =

French neuroscientist (1951–2024)

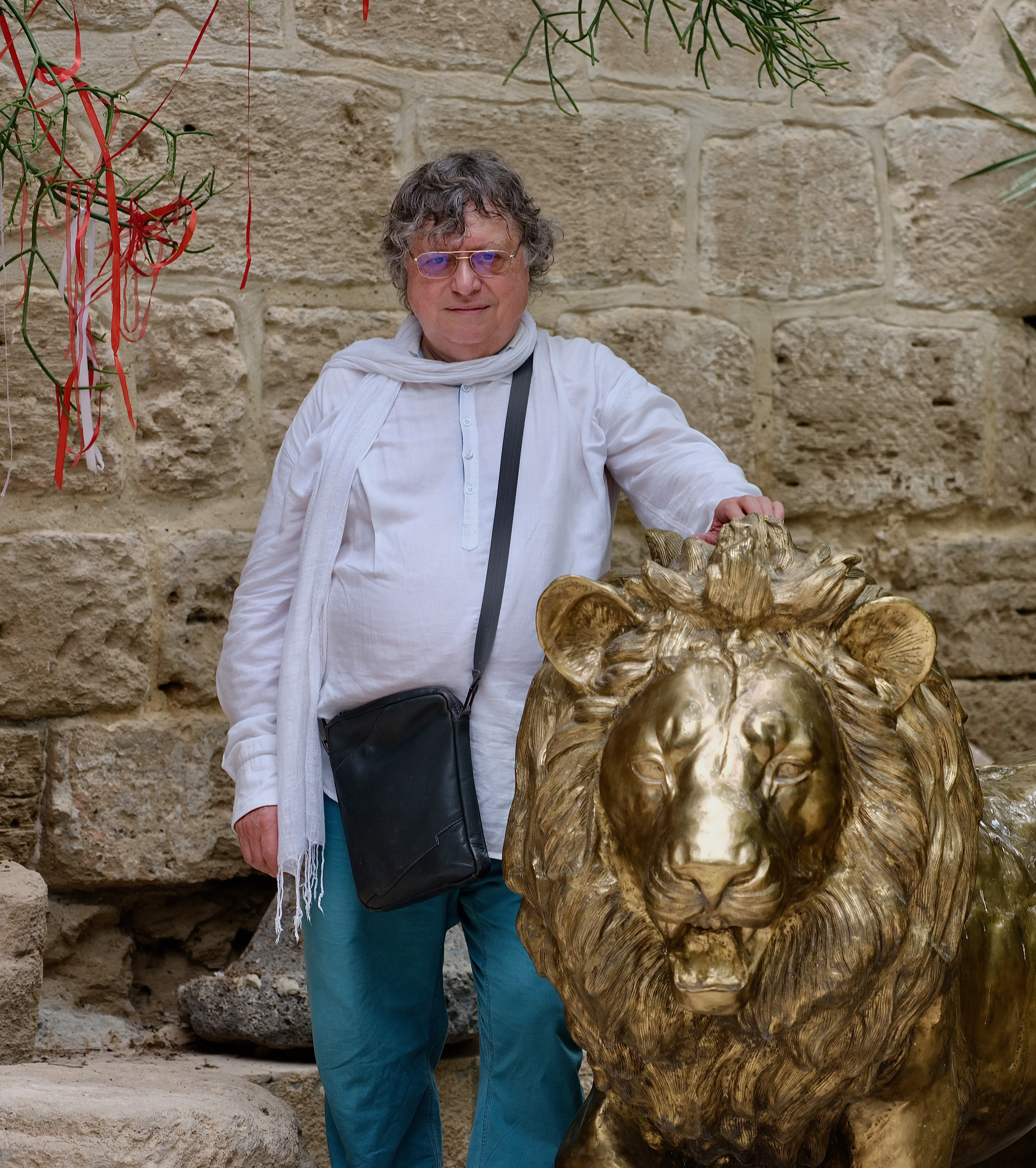
- Born: 13 August 1951; Lyon, France
- Died: 18 October 2024 (aged 73); Gif-sur-Yvette, France
- Education: Professor of Cognitive Sciences at the École Polytechnique (Emeritus) and at CentraleSupélec.
- Known for: Visual Cognitive Sciences
- Awards: Grand Prix thématique de l’Académie des Sciences (Prix Jaffé) in 1999 and the Grand Prix de l’Institut de France (Prix Louis D.) in 2008
- Scientific career
- Fields: Cognitive Neuroscience
- Workplaces: CNRS Institut des Neurosciences Paris-Saclay (NeuroPSI), Saclay, France

Yves Frégnac (13 August 1951 – 17 October 2024) was a neuroscience researcher who specialized in visual neuroscience and neural plasticity. He was known for his pioneering work in systems neuroscience and his integration of experimental and theoretical approaches in studying the visual cortex.

He was professor of cognitive science at École Polytechnique from 2008 to 2016. In 2008, Yves Frégnac was awarded the Grand Prix scientifique de la Fondation Louis D. (Prix Louis D.) by the Institut de France.

== Early life and education ==
Born in Lyon, Frégnac moved to Paris in 1970 to study at École Supérieure d'Electricité (Supélec, now CentraleSupélec). During his engineering studies, he pursued an innovative dual curriculum in biology, earning additional degrees in biophysics, modeling, and neuroscience. A pivotal visit to Michel Imbert's laboratory at the Collège de France, where he witnessed neuronal recordings from the visual cortex, shaped his future career trajectory.

== Scientific career ==
Frégnac completed two doctoral degrees under Michel Imbert's supervision: first in human biology (1978), then in neuroscience (1982) in the institute directed by Yves Laporte. His early research focused on the development of visual cortical cells, publishing groundbreaking work on orientation selectivity and ocular dominance in kittens.

In the 1980s, he established his research team at the Institut de Neurobiologie Alfred Fessard in Gif-sur-Yvette, with ground-breaking work notably on plasticity. In 2000, Frégnac founded a research unit called Unité des Neurosciences Intégratives et Computationelles (UNIC) (and later called Unit of Neuroscience Information and Complexity) within the CNRS. UNIC rapidly became recognised for its original interdisciplinary approach, combining experimental and theoretical neuroscience. Under Yves' leadership, UNIC developed comprehensive data-driven models of cat primary visual cortex, establishing new standards for the integration of experimental data with computational modelling.

== Research contributions ==
Frégnac's research significantly advanced several areas of visual neuroscience:

- Pioneered the use of intracellular recordings in the visual cortex during the 1990s
- Advanced the understanding of how neurons develop and modify their response properties to visual stimuli
- Created comprehensive multi-scale models of primary visual cortex that integrated anatomical, statistical, and functional constraints
- Developed fundamental understanding of push-pull receptive field organization and synaptic depression in V1, demonstrating mechanisms for reliable encoding of natural stimuli

== Later career and critical perspectives ==
In his later career, Frégnac became an influential voice on the future of neuroscience research. His 2017 Science publication critically examined the increasing industrialization of neuroscience and the challenges of big data approaches to understanding the brain. While initially supporting the Human Brain Project, he became a notable critic of its direction, expressing concerns about oversimplified approaches to brain modeling. At the time of his death, he was working on a book titled "Manifesto: In Praise and Defence of a Better Science of Brain and Mind," which remained unfinished.

== Legacy ==
Frégnac was known for his demanding but inspiring teaching style at institutions including École Normale Supérieure and CentraleSupélec. He deliberately presented complex material to challenge students and identify those truly passionate about neuroscience. Beyond his scientific work, Frégnac was a photographer, having held his first exhibition in 1978.
