= Z4 (computer) =

German 1940s computer

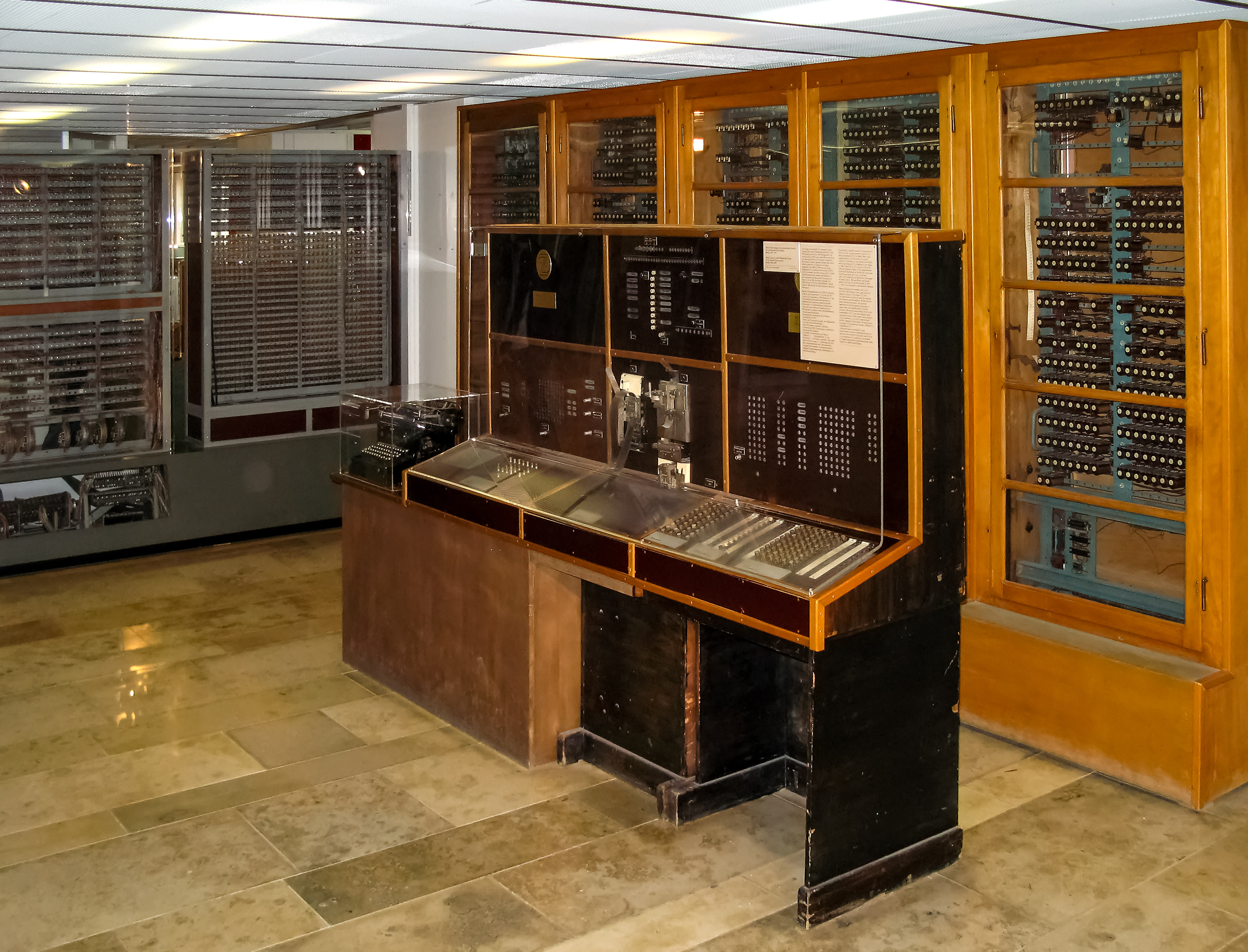
- Z4 on display at the Deutsches Museum, Munich
- Developer: Konrad Zuse
- Manufacturer: Zuse Apparatebau
- Type: Programmable, fully automatic digital electromechanical computer
- Released: 1945; 81 years ago
- Introductory price: SFr 30,000 for five years
- Units sold: 1 (to ETH Zurich in a loan deal)
- CPU: @ (about) 40 Hz
- Memory: Mechanical, 32 bits word length
- Display: Decimal floating point numbers, punch tape or Mercedes typewriter
- Input: Decimal floating point numbers, punch tape
- Power: (about) 4 kW
- Weight: Ca. 1,000 kg (2,200 lb)
- Predecessor: Z3
- Successor: Z5

The Z4 was arguably the world's first commercial digital computer, and is the oldest surviving programmable computer. It was designed, and manufactured by early computer scientist Konrad Zuse's company Zuse Apparatebau, for an order placed by Henschel & Son, in 1942; though only partially assembled in Berlin, then completed in Göttingen in the Third Reich in April 1945, but not delivered before the collapse of Nazi Germany, in 1945. The Z4 was Zuse's final target for the Z3 design. Like the earlier Z2, it comprised a combination of mechanical memory and electromechanical logic.

The Z4 was used at the ETH Zurich from 1950 to 1955, also serving as the inspiration for the construction of the ERMETH, the first Swiss computer, created under the direction of ETH engineer Ambros Speiser.

== Construction ==
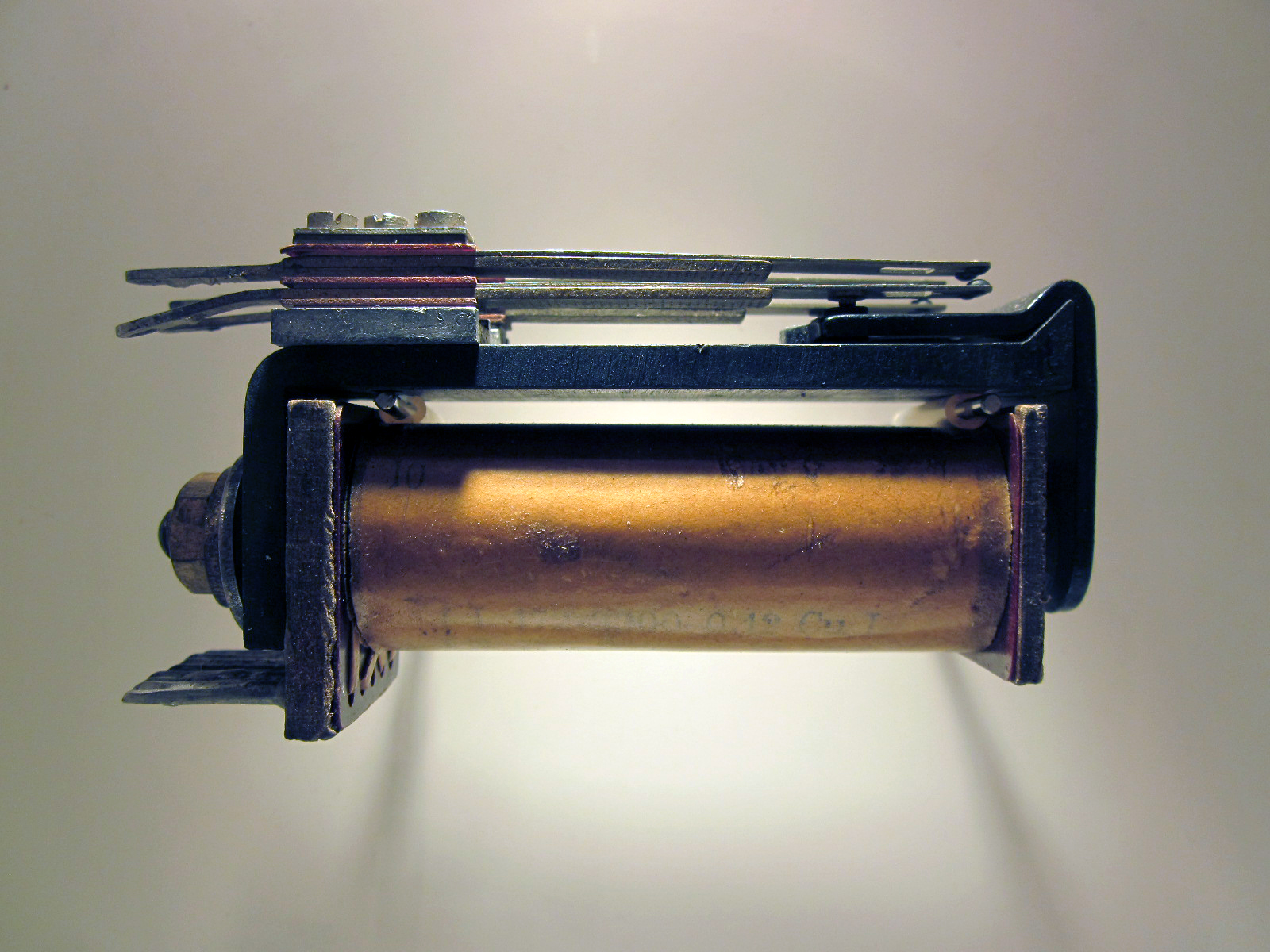
Electromagnetic relay of the Z4

The Z4 was very similar to the Z3 in its design but was significantly enhanced in a number of respects. The memory consisted of 32-bit rather than 22-bit floating point words. The Program Construction Unit (Planfertigungsteil) punched the program tapes, making programming and correcting programs for the machine much easier by the use of symbolic operations and memory cells. Numbers were entered and output as decimal floating-point even though the internal working was in binary. The machine had a large repertoire of instructions including square root, MAX, MIN and sine. Conditional tests included tests for infinity. When delivered to ETH Zurich in 1950 the machine had a conditional branch facility added and could print on a Mercedes typewriter. There were two program tapes where the second could be used to hold a subroutine. (Originally six were planned.)

In 1944, Zuse was working on the Z4 with around two dozen people, including Wilfried de Beauclair. Some engineers who worked at the telecommunications facility of the OKW also worked for Zuse as a secondary occupation. Also in 1944 Zuse transformed his company to the Zuse KG (Kommanditgesellschaft, i.e. a limited partnership) and planned to manufacture 300 computers. This way he could also request additional staff and scientists as a contractor in the Emergency Fighter Program. Zuse's company also cooperated with Alwin Walther's Institute for Applied Mathematics at the Technische Universität Darmstadt.

To prevent it from falling into the hands of the Soviets, the Z4 was evacuated from Berlin in February 1945 and transported to Göttingen. The Z4 was completed in Göttingen in a facility of the Aerodynamische Versuchsanstalt (AVA, Aerodynamic Research Institute), which was headed by Albert Betz. But when it was presented to scientists of the AVA the roar of the approaching front could already be heard, so the computer was transported with a truck of the Wehrmacht to Hinterstein in Bad Hindelang in southern Bavaria, where Konrad Zuse met Wernher von Braun.

By 1947 it was possible for constants to be entered by the punched tape.

== Use after World War II ==
In 1949, the Swiss mathematician Eduard Stiefel, after coming back from a stay in the US where he inspected American computers, visited Zuse and the Z4. When he formulated a differential equation as a test, Zuse immediately programmed the Z4 to solve it. Stiefel decided to acquire the computer for his newly founded Institute for Applied Mathematics at the ETH Zurich. It was delivered to ETH Zurich in 1950.

At least Zürich has an interesting nightlife with the rattling of the Z4, even if it is only modest.

— Konrad Zuse

In 1954, Wolfgang Haack tried to obtain the Z4 for Technische Universität Berlin, but it was instead transferred to the Institut Franco-Allemand des Recherches de St. Louis (ISL, Franco-German Institute of Research) in France, where it was in use until 1959, under its technical head Hubert Schardin. Today, the Z4 is on display in the Deutsches Museum in Munich. The Z4 inspired the ETH to build its own computer (mainly by Ambros Speiser and Eduard Stiefel), which was called ERMETH, an acronym for German: Elektronische Rechenmaschine ETH ("Electronic Computing Machine ETH").

In 1950/1951, the Z4 was the only working digital computer in Central Europe, and the second digital computer in the world to be sold or loaned, beating the Ferranti Mark 1 by five months and the UNIVAC I by ten months, but in turn being beaten by the BINAC (although that never worked at the customer's site). Other computers, all numbered with a leading Z, were built by Zuse and his company. Notable are the Z11, which was sold to the optics industry and to universities, and the Z22.

In 1955 the Z4 was sold to the French-German Research Institute of Saint-Louis (Institut franco-allemand de recherches de Saint-Louis) in Saint-Louis, close to Basel, and in 1960 transferred to the German Museum in Munich.

The Z4 was used for calculations for work on the Grande Dixence Dam in 1950.

== Specifications ==
- Frequency: (about) 40 Hz
- Average calculation speed: 400 ms for an addition, 3 seconds for a multiplication. Approximately 1000 floating point arithmetic operations on average an hour (about 0.3 FLOPS).
- Programming: holes in 35 mm film stock, punched on a programming machine
- Input: Decimal floating point numbers, punch tape
- Output: Decimal floating point numbers, punch tape or Mercedes typewriter
- Word length: 32 bits floating point
- Elements: (about) 2,500 relays, 21 step-wise relays
- Memory: Mechanical memory from the Z1 and Z2 (64 words, 32 bit)
- Power consumption: (about) 4 kW

== See also ==
- Z1
- History of computing hardware
- Reverse Polish notation (RPN)
- Stack machine
