= John Skehel =

British virologist and Emeritus scientist

Sir John Skehel FRS, FMedSci
- Born: John James Skehel; 27 February 1941 (age 85); Blackburn, England, United Kingdom
- Education: University of Aberystwyth (BSc); UMIST (PhD)
- Known for: research on influenza virus
- Spouse: Anita Varley (m. 1962)
- Awards: Wilhelm Feldberg Prize (1986); Robert Koch Prize (1987); Louis-Jeantet Prize for Medicine (1988); Royal Medal (2003); Grand Prix scientifique de la Fondation Louis D. (2007)
- Scientific career
- Fields: Virology
- Workplaces: University of Aberdeen; National Institute for Medical Research
- Thesis: Studies on cation transport in yeast (1965)
- Doctoral advisor: Alan Eddy
- Website: www.crick.ac.uk/research/a-z-researchers/emeritus-scientists/john-skehel/

Sir John James Skehel (born 27 February 1941) is a British virologist and Emeritus scientist at the Francis Crick Institute in London. From 1987 to 2006 he was director of the National Institute of Medical Research (NIMR) at Mill Hill which was incorporated into the Crick Institute in 2016.

== Education and early life ==
Skehel was born in Blackburn to Joseph and Annie Skehel in 1941, and was educated at St. Mary's College, Blackburn and subsequently went to the University of Aberystwyth where he obtained a BSc degree in agricultural biochemistry.

He then completed his postgraduate study at the University of Manchester Institute of Science and Technology (UMIST), where he received his PhD degree in biochemistry in 1966 under the supervision of Alan Eddy, for research on cation transport in yeast.

== Career and research ==
Following his doctorate, he was a postdoctoral researcher at the University of Aberdeen for research, continuing it at Duke University.

In 1969 he returned to Britain and began work at the National Institute for Medical Research on the influenza virus. In 1984 he was made head of the virology division, followed by a promotion in 1987 to director of the Institute. He was director of the World Health Organization (WHO)'s Collaborating Centre for Reference and Research on Influenza from 1975 to 1993.

== Awards and honours ==
He was elected a Fellow of the Royal Society (FRS) in 1984. He was awarded the Wilhelm Feldberg Prize in 1986, the Robert Koch Prize in 1987, the Louis-Jeantet Prize for Medicine in 1988, the ICN International Prize in Virology in 1992, the Royal Medal in 2003 for "his pioneering research into virology", and the Grand Prix scientifique de la Fondation Louis D. (shared with Dutch virologist Ab Osterhaus) of the Institut de France in 2007. Skehel was knighted in the 1997 New Year Honours. In 1998, he became a founding Fellow of the Academy of Medical Sciences (FMedSci). In November 2013, he was appointed Vice-President and Biological Secretary of the Royal Society. He was made an honorary professor of Liverpool John Moores University in 1993 and given an honorary fellowship in 2007. In 2004, he was also awarded an honorary DSc degree from University College London. In 2020 he was elected to the American Philosophical Society.

== Personal life ==
Soon after graduating he married Anita Varley in 1962, with whom he has two sons.
