= Eduard Stiefel =

Swiss mathematician (1909–1978)

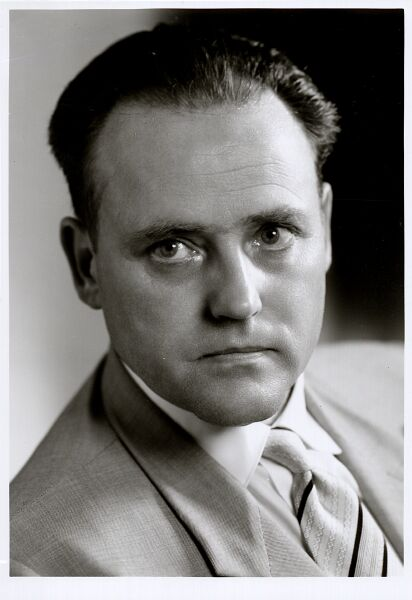
- Eduard Stiefel, 1955
- Born: 21 April 1909; Zürich, Switzerland
- Died: 25 November 1978 (aged 69); Zürich, Switzerland
- Education: ETH Zurich
- Known for: Stiefel manifold Stiefel–Whitney class conjugate gradient method Kustaanheimo–Stiefel regularization
- Scientific career
- Fields: Mathematics
- Workplaces: ETH Zürich
- Doctoral advisor: Heinz Hopf
- Doctoral students: Corrado Böhm; Fritz-Rudolf Güntsch; Werner Gysin; Peter Henrici; Urs Kirchgraber; Peter Läuchli; Max Rössler; Ambros Speiser; Carl August Zehnder

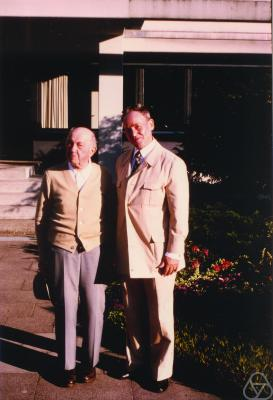
Eduard Stiefel (right) together with Otto Volk in Oberwolfach, 1978

Eduard Ludwig Stiefel (21 April 1909 – 25 November 1978) was a Swiss mathematician. Together with Cornelius Lanczos and Magnus Hestenes, he invented the conjugate gradient method, and gave what is now understood to be a partial construction of the Stiefel–Whitney classes of a real vector bundle, thus co-founding the study of characteristic classes.

== Early life and education ==
Stiefel was born on 21 April 1909 in Zürich. His father was the painter and graphic artist Eduard Stiefel, after whom he was named.

Stiefel attended schools in his hometown and from 1927 to 1931 studied mathematics and physics at the Swiss Federal Institute of Technology (ETH Zurich). He graduated with distinction in 1931 and continued his studies at the University of Hamburg and University of Göttingen. In 1935 he received his doctorate from ETH under Heinz Hopf, with a dissertation entitled Richtungsfelder und Fernparallelismus in n-dimensionalen Mannigfaltigkeiten (Direction fields and distant parallelism in n-dimensional manifolds). After a period as a research assistant, Stiefel completed his habilitation, becoming a Privatdozent in 1942 and a full professor at ETH Zurich in 1943.

== Career ==
Stiefel's early research was in topology, including work on the topology of Lie groups and fibre bundles. A class of characteristic classes, the Stiefel–Whitney class, bears his name. His classification of fibre bundles over spheres also found application in the classification of algebras, as discussed by Friedrich Hirzebruch in Heinz-Dieter Ebbinghaus et al., Zahlen (Springer, 1992).

Besides his academic pursuits, Stiefel was also active as a military officer, rising to the rank of colonel in the Swiss army during World War II.

He later turned entirely to numerical mathematics. After achieving his full professorship at ETH Zurich in 1943, Stiefel founded the Institute for Applied Mathematics in 1948, which he also directed. The objective of the new institute was to design and construct an electronic computer (the Elektronische Rechenmaschine der ETH, or ERMETH). For this, Stiefel located a Z4 computer by Konrad Zuse in Bavaria in 1949; the machine was leased from Zuse and restored to working order for ETH. This made ETH Zurich the first university on the European continent to operate a programmable computing machine, which was used, among other tasks, to calculate the gravity wall of a dam. Stiefel later sent his assistants Heinz Rutishauser and Ambros Speiser to the United States to study computing machines, which led to the development of ETH's own computer, ERMETH, in operation from 1955 to 1963.

He also spent a year in the United States commencing in August, 1951. During this time, he met Magnus Hestenes and other scientists at the National Bureau of Standards and these professional associations served him during the remainder of his career at Zurich.

Stiefel also worked on celestial mechanics, in particular the calculation of satellite orbits, and more broadly on perturbation theory. A regularisation method developed by him and Paul Kustaanheimo, applying spinors and a transformation in four-dimensional space, bears his name – The Kustaanheimo–Stiefel regularization. Stiefel received research contracts from ESA (and its predecessor ESRO) and from NASA. From 1966 to 1970 he served as president of the Swiss Committee for Space Research.

Stiefel, who edited Issai Schur's lectures on representation theory at ETH Zurich in 1936, also authored a book on group theory and one on descriptive geometry.

In 1952 he developed the conjugate gradient method in numerical linear algebra together with Magnus Hestenes.

In 1956 he served as president of the Swiss Mathematical Society. From 1970 to 1974 he was president of the Society for Applied Mathematics and Mechanics (GAMM).

In 1954 he delivered a plenary lecture at the International Congress of Mathematicians in Amsterdam, entitled "Recent developments in relaxation techniques".

Among Stiefel's doctoral students were Ambros Speiser, Peter Henrici, Urs Kirchgraber, Fritz-Rudolf Güntsch, Max Rössler, and Jörg Waldvogel.

== Honors ==
Stiefel was a member of the Norwegian Academy of Science and Letters and the Leopoldina, and received honorary doctorates from KU Leuven (1971), the University of Würzburg (1974), and the University of Braunschweig (1975). In 1968 he held a visiting professorship at the Université libre de Bruxelles. Stiefel also served as a colonel of artillery in the Swiss Army and was a member of the Zürich city council from 1958 to 1966, representing the Landesring der Unabhängigen.

== See also ==
- Stiefel manifold
- Stiefel–Whitney class
