= Ambros Speiser =

Swiss engineer and scientist (1922–2003)

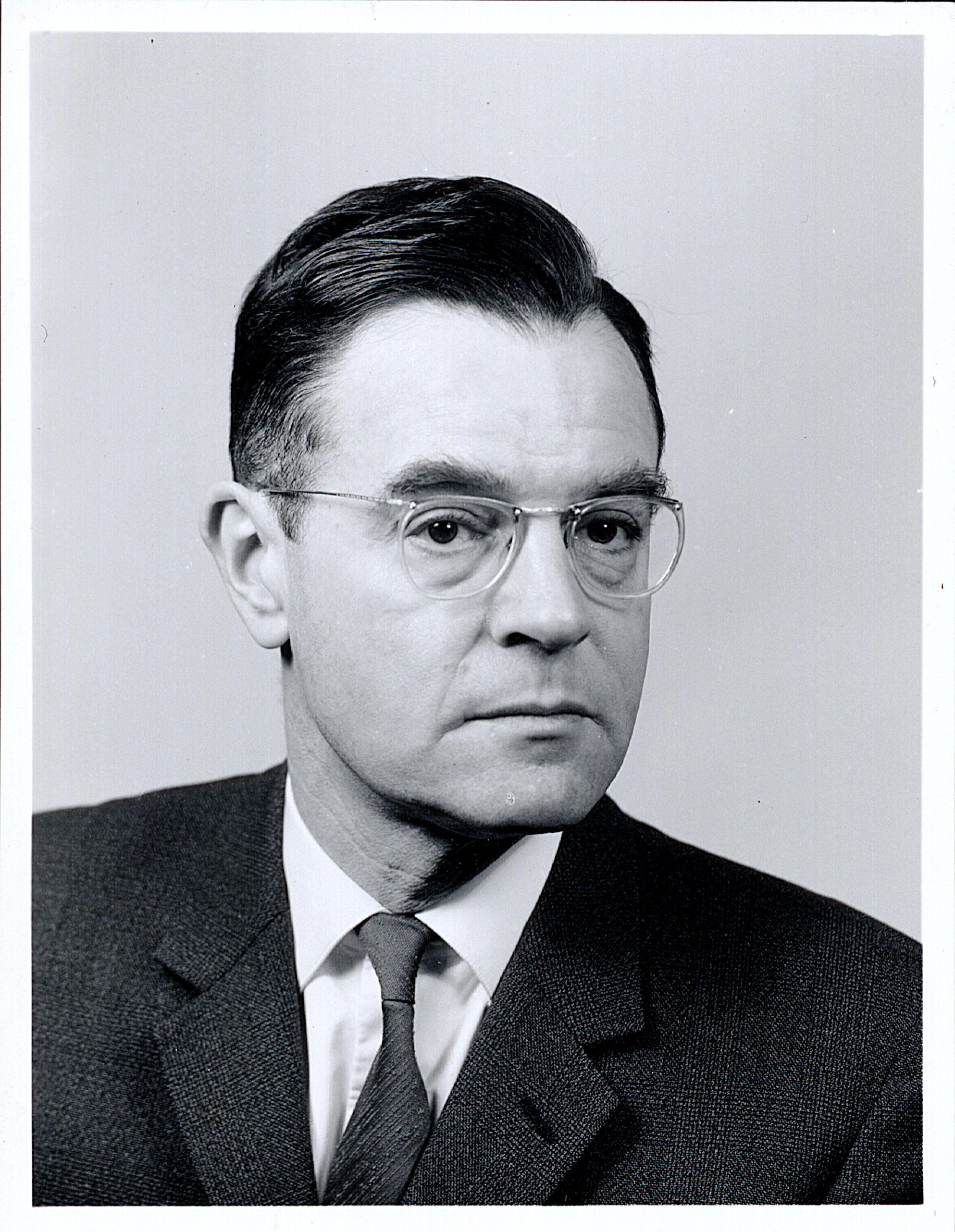
Speiser in 1970

Ambrosius Paul Speiser (November 13 1922, in Basel – May 10 2003, in Aarau) was a Swiss engineer and scientist. He led the development of the first Swiss electronic computer.

Speiser studied electrotechnology at Eidgenössische Technische Hochschule (ETH), where in 1948 he earned his diplom in communications engineering. In 1949, Eduard Stiefel sent Heinz Rutishauser and Speiser to study in Harvard under Howard H. Aiken and in Princeton under John von Neumann; Rutishauser and Speiser became acquainted with the Harvard Mark III and the IAS machine. In 1950, the Institut für angewandte Mathematik (Institute for Applied Mathematics, founded in 1948) of ETH acquired the Zuse Z4. As there were no other commercially available electronic computers which were suitable for scientific applications aside from the Z4, this led the Swiss to the idea of developing their own computer inspired by the Z4. Under Speiser's technical direction between 1950 and 1955, Switzerland's first electronic calculating machine, ERMETH, originated.

Speiser earned his doctorate and habilitation during the development of ERMETH, but began an industrial career when he joined IBM in 1955. From 1956 to 1966 he was the director of IBM Zurich Research Laboratory in Rüschlikon, the only research center of IBM outside of the USA at the time. In 1966 he left IBM to become the director of research for Brown, Boveri & Cie in order to develop the company's research center in Dättwil. He also served as the second president of the International Federation for Information Processing from 1965 to 1968.

In 1962 ETH made Speiser a full professor. For years, he taught one of the first courses in computer science at the ETH. In 1986 ETH honored him with an honorary doctorate for his pioneering work at the frontier of informatics. The Schweizerische Akademie der Technischen Wissenschaften chose Speiser on 1987 as president of its executive committee and upon his resignation in 1993 made him an honorary member. Speiser was also a member of the Schweizerischen Schulrats, member of the board of trustees of the Schweizerischer Nationalfonds, and from 1983 to 1988 president of Vororts (now Economiesuisse).

== Works ==
- Ambros P. Speiser: Entwurf eines elektronischen Rechengerätes unter besonderer Berücksichtigung der Erfordernis eines minimalen Materialaufwandes bei gegebener mathematischer Leistungsfähigkeit. Dissertation ETH Zürich, 1950.
- Heinz Rutishauser, Ambros Paul Speiser, Eduard Stiefel: Programmgesteuerte digitale Rechengeräte (Elektronische Rechenmaschinen). Basel: Birkhäuser, 1951.
- Ambros P. Speiser: Ueber die Zukunft der Technik. Eine weltweite Betrachtung. Referat und Diskussion der 33. Sitzung der Studiengruppe Energieperspektiven, Baden, 28. Januar 1988.
