= Ab Osterhaus =

Dutch virologist (born 1948)

Albert Osterhaus
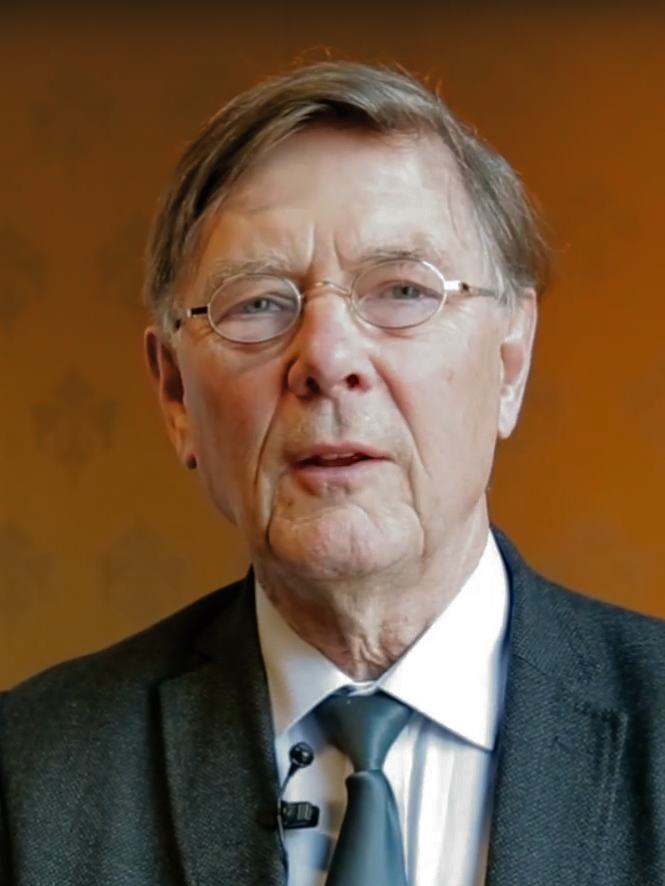
- Osterhaus in 2016
- Born: Albertus Dominicus Marcellinus Erasmus Osterhaus; 2 June 1948 (age 78); Amsterdam, Netherlands
- Education: Utrecht University (MSc and PhD)
- Known for: Identification of SARS coronavirus SARS drug Vaccine for H5N1
- Awards: M.W. Beijerinck Award; Louis D. Grand Prize
- Scientific career
- Fields: Virology
- Workplaces: TiHo Hannover
- Doctoral advisor: Marian Horzinek

Albertus Dominicus Marcellinus Erasmus "Ab" Osterhaus (born 2 June 1948) is a leading Dutch virologist and influenza expert. An Emeritus Professor of Virology at Erasmus University Rotterdam since 1993, Osterhaus is known throughout the world for his work on SARS and H5N1, the pathogen that causes avian influenza.

== Life ==
Osterhaus was born into a Roman Catholic family of seven and grew up in Slotermeer, Amsterdam. From 1967 he studied at the Utrecht University where he graduated with a degree in veterinary medicine cum laude in 1974. He then obtained his PhD degree at the same university in 1978 with a dissertation entitled Feline infectious peritonitis: identification, propagation and epidemiology.

He fulfilled several positions in his 16-year career at the Netherlands National Institute for Public Health and the Environment (RIVM) in Bilthoven, the last of which was head of the laboratory for Immunobiology. During that period he was also a part-time Professor of Environmental Virology at the Institute for Virology in Utrecht, a position he still holds as of 2009. In 1993, he became Professor of Virology at the Medical Faculty of University and also head of the Department of Virology at Erasmus University Medical Centre Rotterdam. In 2013, he stepped down from his position as head of the department of Viroscience, as the Virology department is now known, and handed over the reins to Professor Marion Koopmans, formerly attached to the Dutch National Institute of Health, the RIVM. Osterhaus did not rest and set up a new institute looking at the zoonotic side of virology at TiHo in Hannover, Germany. He also holds a position at Artemis BV in Utrecht.

Osterhaus played an important role in the identification of the SARS coronavirus. In February 2004, his team found that Pegylated interferon alpha, a drug used for the treatment of patients with Hepatitis C, helps combat the virus that causes SARS.

Osterhaus holds various editorial positions for scientific journals, holds several patents, has been supervisor of more than 40 PhD students and has identified more than a dozen “new” viral pathogens and he is author of more than 1000 scientific papers, including journals like Nature, Science and The Lancet. Osterhaus served as member and chairman of many international scientific committees, most notably four WHO reference centres, the Dutch Influenza Centre, the Dutch Health Council and the European Scientific Working group on Influenza (ESWI).

== Honours and awards ==
Osterhaus received several awards in his life, including the Dutch "M.W. Beijerinck Virology Award", a prize awarded triennially (before 2014, and now awarded biennially) by the Royal Netherlands Academy of Arts and Sciences in 1998. He is also a Member of Royal Netherlands Academy of Arts and Sciences (KNAW) since 2001.

On 15 October 2003 Osterhaus was knighted as Commander in the Order of the Dutch Lion. Other awards Osterhaus received include the Dutch "Dr. Saal van Zwanenberg Prijs" for pharmacotherapy, the "Reinier de Graaf Medaille" for clinical medicine, and on 13 June 2007 he was awarded the French "Grand Prix scientifique de la Fondation Louis D." of the Institut de France. He shared the €450,000 prize money with National Institute for Medical Research professor Sir John Skehel from London. In 2016 he became a member of the German Academy of Sciences Leopoldina.

== Criticism ==
Osterhaus has been criticised for what has been described as a 'fear campaign', for exaggerating the consequences of the 2009 flu pandemic and pushing for extensive measures, even though the pandemic influenza (H1N1) is now treated as if it were a common flu. Physician and microbiologist Miquel Ekkelenkamp called Osterhaus a 'scaremonger' in an opinion piece in nrc.next and said: "'Expert' Osterhaus should be banned indefinitely from television. Everything he claimed turned out to be untrue: we're not all going to die like we did in 1918, not everyone needs a vaccination, we are not going to give Tamiflu to everyone and the virus has not mutated into something much more dangerous." Osterhaus claimed he has not exaggerated the risks. During debate 'De Kwestie live' he said "I have named a wide spectrum of possibilities and minister Ab Klink decided to go for the worst-case scenario".

In September 2009, a controversy arose when it became known Osterhaus has a 9.8% share in ViroClinics B.V, a pharmaceutical company that supposedly benefits from the 34 million vaccines Health minister Ab Klink bought based on his advice as government consultant. Osterhaus maintains he did nothing against the law and that he does not personally benefit from the order.
