= Maria Ibáñez =

Spanish materials scientist and academic

Maria Ibáñez Sabaté
- Education: University of Barcelona
- Scientific career
- Workplaces: University of Chicago; California Institute of Technology; Cornell University; Northwestern University; ETH Zurich
- Thesis: Functional nanomaterials from the bottom-up assembly of colloidal nanoparticles : a strategy towards efficient thermoelectric (2013)
- Academic advisors: Maksym Kovalenko
- Website: Ibáñez Group

Maria Ibáñez Sabaté is a Spanish materials scientist and Professor at the Institute of Science and Technology Austria. Her research considers functional nanomaterials for next generation technologies. She was awarded the ETH Zurich Ružička Prize in 2017.

== Early life and education ==
Ibáñez studied physics at the University of Barcelona. She remained there for her doctoral research, where she developed synthesis strategies for colloidal nanoparticles. Her research originally considered materials for photovoltaics, but she became increasingly interested in thermoelectric materials. During her doctoral research she completed placements at the French Alternative Energies and Atomic Energy Commission, University of Chicago, California Institute of Technology, Cornell University and Northwestern. Her doctoral research was awarded the Extraordinary Award, the University of Barcelona's highest accolade. After earning her doctorate she joined ETH Zurich, where she worked with Maksym Kovalenko.

== Research and career ==
In 2017 Ibáñez was awarded the Ružička Prize for her work on developing new thermoelectric materials. She joined the Institute of Science and Technology Austria as an assistant professor in 2018. She was promoted to the Verbund Professor for Energy Sciences in 2022.

Her research considers nanocrystals that can be used as building blocks to engineer metamaterials. She is interested in the development of solution processed thermoelectric materials with high Seebeck coefficients, electrical conductivities and thermal conductivities.

== Select publications ==
- Jonathan De Roo; Maria Ibáñez; Pieter Geiregat; et al. (19 January 2016). "Highly Dynamic Ligand Binding and Light Absorption Coefficient of Cesium Lead Bromide Perovskite Nanocrystals". ACS Nano. 10 (2): 2071–2081. doi:10.1021/acsnano.5b06295. ISSN 1936-0851. PMID 26786064. S2CID 206697106. Wikidata Q49080808.
- Claudia Coughlan; Maria Ibáñez; Oleksandr Dobrozhan; Ajay Singh; Andreu Cabot; Kevin M. Ryan (10 April 2017). "Compound Copper Chalcogenide Nanocrystals". Chemical Reviews. 117 (9): 5865–6109. doi:10.1021/acs.chemrev.6b00376. ISSN 0009-2665. PMID 28394585. Wikidata Q39231751.
- Wenhua Li; Reza Zamani; Pilar Rivera Gil; et al. (6 May 2013). "CuTe nanocrystals: shape and size control, plasmonic properties, and use as SERS probes and photothermal agents". Journal of the American Chemical Society. 135 (19): 7098–7101. doi:10.1021/ja401428e. ISSN 0002-7863. PMID 23647089. Wikidata Q42819912.

== Personal life ==
Ibáñez is married with two sons.
