= Alan Eddy =

British biochemist (1926-2017)

Alfred Alan Eddy
- Born: 4 November 1926; St Just in Penwith, Cornwall, England
- Died: 24 October 2017 (aged 90); Disley, Cheshire, England
- Education: Exeter College, Oxford
- Spouse: Susan Ruth Slade-Jones
- Scientific career
- Fields: Biology of yeast, trans-membrane transport
- Workplaces: Brewing Industry Research Foundation; UMIST; University of Manchester
- Thesis: The Physical chemistry of bacterial growth : the role of alkali metal ions in bacterial metabolism (1951)
- Doctoral advisor: Cyril Norman Hinshelwood
- Doctoral students: John Skehel

Professor Alfred Alan Eddy (4 November 1926 – 24 October 2017), usually known as Alan Eddy, was a biochemist who was Professor of Biochemistry at the University of Manchester Institute of Science and Technology (UMIST) between 1959 and 1994.

== Early life and education ==
Eddy was born on 4 November 1926 in St Just, Cornwall, the son of Alfred and Ellen Eddy. After completing his secondary education at Devonport High School for Boys, he attended Exeter College, Oxford, graduating with a 1st Class Honours degree in 1949. He was awarded his DPhil in 1951, supervised by Cyril Hinshelwood.

== Career ==
In 1953, Eddy joined the Brewing Industry Research Foundation in Nutfield. Using snail gastric extracts Eddy, in 1957, was able to prepare protoplasts/sphaeroplasts of the yeast S. pastorianus; the ability to produce cell wall-free yeasts was important in facilitating much of later yeast research. In 1959, he was appointed to the first chair of Biochemistry at UMIST; he oversaw the creation of the Department of Biochemistry from the previously existing Brewing Chemistry department. He held this position until his retirement in 1994. He was Emeritus Professor in the Faculty of Life Sciences at the University of Manchester until his death in 2017.

Eddy's research interests were diverse, but his major contributions were in the biology of trans-membrane transport, in particular the functioning of proton pumps and symport systems.

== Personal life ==
Eddy lived in Disley, Cheshire with his wife Susan Ruth (née Slade-Jones), whom he married in 1954. They had two sons.

He died on 24 October 2017 at the age of 90.

== Bibliography ==
- Wilson, D. (2008) Reconfiguring Biological Sciences in the Late Twentieth Century: a Study of the University of Manchester. Manchester University
