= Philippe Block =

Belgian professor, engineer, architect, and entrepreneur (b. 1980)

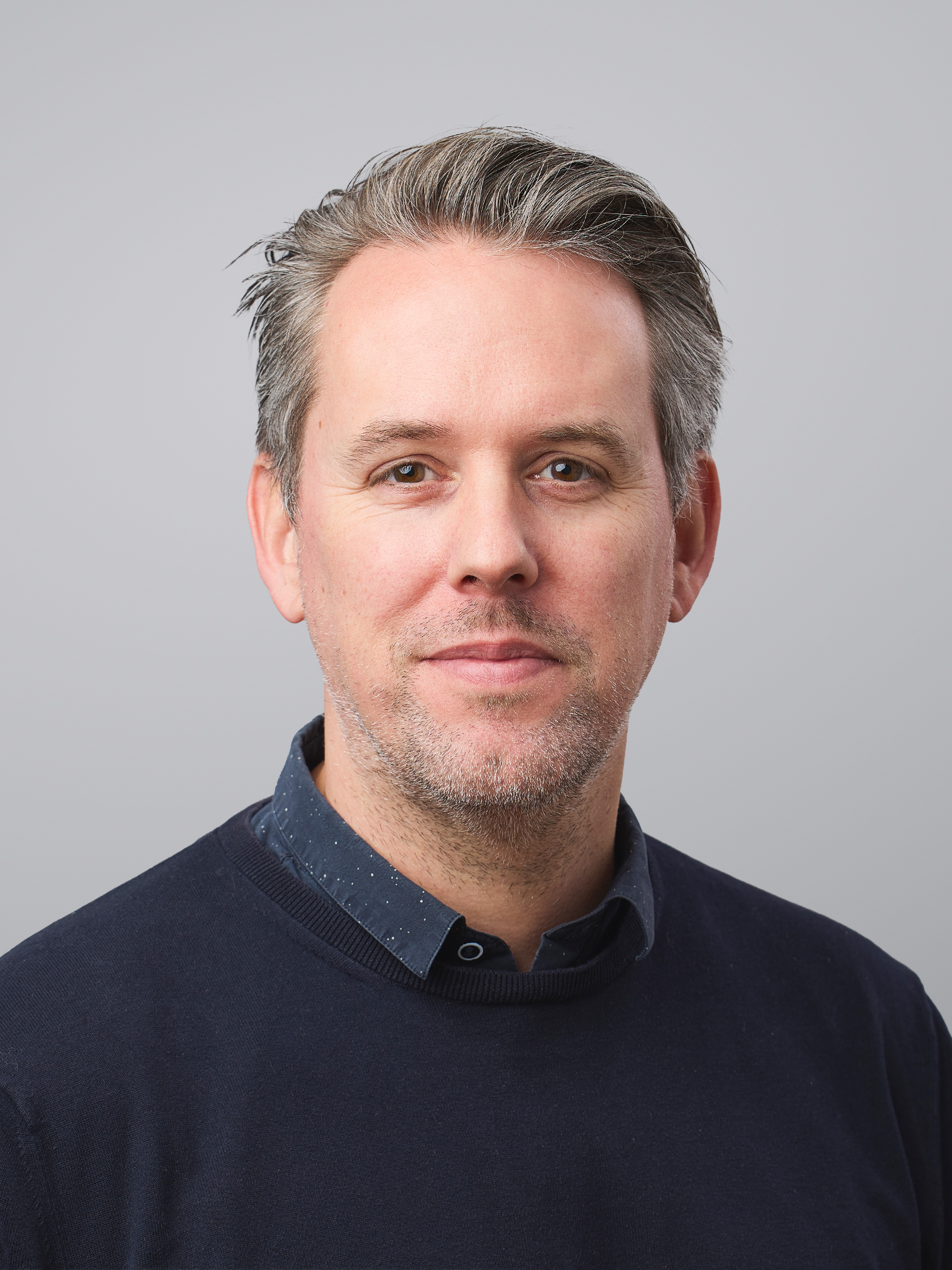
- Born: May 4, 1980 (age 45); Sint-Lambrechts-Woluwe, Brussels, Belgium
- Education: Vrije Universiteit Brussel (MSc 2003), Massachusetts Institute of Technology (MIT) (SMArchS 2005, PhD 2009)
- Occupations: Professor, structural engineer, architect, researcher, entrepreneur, board member
- Employer: ETH Zurich
- Known for: Pioneering research and structural design of compression-only shell and vaulted structures in masonry and (unreinforced) concrete, combining computational methods and digital fabrication with material-efficient, sustainable, and circular construction techniques
- Title: Professor
- Website: https://brg.ethz.ch/

Philippe Block (born May 4, 1980) is a Belgian professor at the Swiss Federal Institute of Technology Zurich (ETH Zurich), structural engineer, architect, and researcher at the Block Research Group (BRG), entrepreneur and co-founder of Vaulted AG, and board member at the Holcim Group. He is known for his pioneering research and structural design of compression-only shell and vaulted structures in masonry and (unreinforced) concrete, combining computational methods and digital fabrication with material-efficient, sustainable, and circular construction methods.

== Early life and education ==
Philippe Block studied Architectural Engineering (then called Civil Engineering – Architecture) at Vrije Universiteit Brussel (VUB) from 1998 to 2003. His master’s thesis, titled “Scissor-Hinge Deployable Membrane Structures Tensioned by Pleated Pneumatic Artificial Muscles”, was produced jointly with Tom Van Mele, and supervised by Prof. Marijke Mollaert (architecture) and Dr Frank Mollaert (robotics).

From 2003 to 2009, Block pursued graduate studies at the Massachusetts Institute of Technology (MIT) School of Architecture and Planning. In 2005, he completed a Master of Science in Architectural Studies (SMArchS) with a thesis titled “Equilibrium Systems: Studies in Masonry Structure”. In 2009, he obtained his PhD with a dissertation titled “Thrust Network Analysis: Exploring Three-Dimensional Equilibrium”, supervised by Prof. John Ochsendorf. His research introduced thrust network analysis, a novel method for assessing the safety of (historic) unreinforced masonry vaulted structures and for designing compression-only shell structures. His first year of graduate studies was supported by the Belgian American Educational Foundation (BAEF), where he was a 2003 Fellow.

During his PhD, Block undertook research exchanges, spending four months at the Centre for Information Technology and Architecture (CITA) of the Royal Danish Academy of Fine Arts in Denmark, supervised by the late Prof. Ture Wester, and five months at the Institute of Lightweight Structures and Conceptual Design (ILEK) at the University of Stuttgart in Germany, supervised by Prof. Werner Sobek.

== Career ==
Block joined ETH Zurich in 2009 as an assistant professor (tenure track) in Building Structures at the Institute of Technology in Architecture (ITA), Department of Architecture (D-ARCH), where he founded the Block Research Group (BRG), co-leading the group with Dr Tom Van Mele since 2010. He obtained tenure and was promoted to associate professor of Architecture and Structures in 2014, and became a full professor in 2017. That same year, he was appointed director of the Swiss National Centre of Competence in Research on Digital Fabrication (NCCR DFAB). He is also associated with the Department of Civil, Environmental and Geomatic Engineering (D-BAUG). He became head of ITA in 2021, and is director of Studies at D-ARCH since 2025.

In parallel with his academic career, Block has been involved in several professional activities. After graduating from MIT, he co-founded the engineering firm Ochsendorf DeJong & Block (ODB) with Prof. John Ochsendorf and Prof. Matthew DeJong, his advisor and colleague at MIT. ODB specialises in the structural assessment of historic monuments in unreinforced masonry and in the design and engineering of innovative shell structures. Block stepped down as a partner of ODB in 2021.

In 2023, Block and Van Mele co-founded VAULTED AG with Dr Francesco Ranaudo, an ETH Zurich spin-off specialising in the design, engineering, manufacturing, and distribution of the Rippmann Floor System (RFS), a low-carbon, circular, unreinforced concrete structural floor. The system is named in honour of their late colleague Dr Matthias Rippmann, who passed away in 2019. The company’s first project, CreaTower I, a ten-storey office building in Zug, Switzerland, designed by Gigon/Guyer Architects, will feature 6,500 m² of RFS.

Since 2020, Block has served as a board member of Holcim Group, one of the world’s largest building materials companies, and has chaired its Health, Safety, and Sustainability Committee since 2022. In this role, he applies his expertise in sustainable construction, fabrication innovation, and structural design to support efforts to decarbonise the construction industry.

== Research ==
The Block Research Group (BRG) at ETH Zurich, directed by Block and Van Mele, conducts research in structural design, computational engineering, digital fabrication and sustainable construction. The group’s guiding motto is strength through geometry, and it draws on the principles of traditional unreinforced masonry to explore efficient structural systems and resource-minimal, fully circular construction.

The BRG’s research pursues three main thrusts: 1) developing geometry-informed structural design methods that minimise material use and embodied carbon 2) creating digital design and fabrication tools that enable accurate implementation of these methods, and 3) translating those methods into built prototypes and demonstrators in both high-tech and low-tech contexts, adapting to diverse social, cultural and geographical conditions.

The BRG is known for translating its research into large-scale physical prototypes and demonstrators. Notable projects include the unreinforced stone Armadillo Vault (Venice Biennale, 2016); the thin, knitted-concrete shell KnitCandela (Mexico City, 2018); the ultra thin, doubly-curved and two-layered concrete shell roof NEST HiLo (Dübendorf 2019–2020) project; the lightweight, low-carbon Rippmann Floor System (2016–2023); and the 3D-printed masonry bridges Striatus (Venice, 2021), and Phoenix (Lyon, 2023), both unreinforced concrete structures assembled without mortar.

The BRG also contributes to the development of open-source computational tools widely used in practice and academia. These include the RhinoVAULT plugin for compression-only form-finding, and the COMPAS Python framework for computational design, engineering and digital fabrication workflows. COMPAS is the world’s largest open source computational framework for research and collaboration in Architecture, Engineering, Fabrication, and construction.

== Recognition and selected awards ==
- 2025 Honorary Royal Designer for Industry, The Royal Society of Arts, UK
- 2023 Dandelion Award, ETH Zurich, Switzerland
- 2022 VUB Honorary Engineering Fellowship, Vrije Universiteit Brussel, Belgium
- 2022 Myron Goldsmith Memorial Fellowship, Illinois Institute of Technology, United States
- 2021 DigitalFUTURES Fellowship, Tongji University's College of Architecture and Urban Planning (CAUP), Shanghai, China
- 2019 VUB Engineering Fellowship, Vrije Universiteit Brussel, Belgium
- 2018 Rössler Prize, ETH Zurich Foundation, Switzerland
- 2018 Berlin Art Prize for Architecture (Baukunst), Academy of Arts, Berlin, Germany
- 2017 Associated member of the Federation of Swiss Architects (BSA-FAS), Switzerland
- 2012 Edoardo Benvenuto Prize, Associazione Edoardo Benvenuto, Italy
- 2010 Tsuboi Award, International Association for Shell and Spatial Structures, (shared with Dr Tom Van Mele)
- 2010 Golden Owl Award, ETH Zurich’s Students Association (VSETH), Switzerland
- 2007 Hangai Prize, International Association for Shell and Spatial Structures

== Selected book publications ==
- Adriaenssens, S., Block, P., Veenendaal, D., & Williams, C. (2014). Shell Structures for Architecture: Form Finding and Optimization. Routledge.
- Block, P., Van Mele, T., Rippmann, M., & Paulson, N. C. (2017). Beyond Bending: Reimagining Compression Shells (Detail Special Edition).
- Block, P., Gengnagel, C., & Peters, S. (2015). Faustformel Tragwerksentwurf. Deutsche Verlags-Anstalt.
