= Wilfried de Beauclair =

Swiss-born German engineer and computer scientist (1912–2020)

- Born: 4 April 1912; Ascona, Switzerland
- Died: 22 April 2020 (aged 108); Ulm, Baden-Württemberg, Germany
- Citizenship: German
- Education: Darmstadt University of Technology
- Occupations: Engineer, computer scientist

Wilfried de Beauclair (4 April 1912 – 22 April 2020) was a Swiss-born German engineer and computer scientist. His work on automated computing technology makes him one of the first-generation computer pioneers.

== Biography ==
De Beauclair was born on 4 April 1912 in Ascona, Switzerland, as the second son of the painting couple Alexander Wilhelm de Beauclair and Friederike de Beauclair. He grew up with his brother Gotthard de Beauclair in the artists' colony on Monte Verità. In 1920, his mother moved with the two children to Darmstadt, where the family came from. From 1921 to 1930 he went to school in Darmstadt.

In 1930, de Beauclair began studying general mechanical engineering at the Darmstadt University of Technology. After completing his studies, he was initially taken on as a research assistant and then as an assistant at the Institute for Practical Mathematics (IPM), headed by Alwin Walther. There, he was involved in the construction of an automatic calculator with punched tape programming, which was destroyed during the bombing of Darmstadt like the entire IPM. He also worked on the development of devices for Fourier analysis. From 1939, he developed together with Hans-Joachim Dreyer, both from IPM to the company OTT in Kempten, a new type of electromechanical cutting wheel integration system to solve differential equations, the DGM-IPM-Ott, of which there are still assemblies in the inventory of the German Museum Munich.

In 1942, he met Konrad Zuse in Berlin, who showed him the Z3 computer system. As head of the precision engineering workshop at the IPM, de Beauclair subsequently supported Zuse with the work on the Z4. Among other things, the IPM supplied punching devices for punched tape that were used to control the program sequence and to save intermediate results. Zuse and de Beauclair became friends. In January 1945, de Beauclair became Dr.-Ing. with Alwin Walther at the TU Darmstadt with a thesis on multidimensional Fourier synthesis doctorate.

In April 1945, he was interned by the French military, and brought to Alsace while traveling to the Allgäu. In December 1945, his civilian status was recognized and de Beauclair released from internment. However, he was seriously ill with tuberculosis, was unable to work and had to be hospitalized from 1946 to 1950. In 1949, his doctoral thesis was published.

After being released from the hospital, the family moved to Stuttgart in late 1950. Initially de Beauclair worked for the Göttingen company PHYWE in sales, then from 1955 as a development engineer and laboratory manager at SEL, where Dr.-Ing. Dreyer was active. There, he was involved in the development of the ER 56 electronic computer and suitable peripheral devices. After the SEL Informatik plant was closed in 1960, he moved to the German Bundespost, where he worked as head of the computerization department at the Central Post Office in Darmstadt where the postal check and savings bank services worked and was there in particular responsible for programming the IT systems. He led the project for microfilming receipts in the course of automatic receipt reading. Due to the microfilming, the documents should also be available in the EDP after processing and should therefore remain legally valid. In addition, the banks tried to save storage space in the early 1960s. Microfilming was a key project for the success of bank automation.

In 1968 his book, Calculating with Machines, a visual history of computing technology from its origins to 1964, was published by the FAZ, then reviewed and reprinted in 2005 by Springer-Verlag. In 1977 he retired at the age of 65 as Chief Post Office Director.

De Beauclair died on 4 April 2020.

== Awards and honors ==
In May 2002, he was awarded the Prochorov Order of the International Informatization Academy (Moscow) at the Deutsches Museum in Munich. In April 2004, he was awarded for his work in the field of computer science from the prestigious Moscow Technical University MIREA (Moscow Institute of Radio Engineering, Electronics and Automation) the title of professor honoris causa.

== Personal life ==
Wilfried de Beauclair was married to Gertrud Schäfer from 1942 until her death in 1968 and is the father of a daughter and a son. His second wife Martha, with whom he had moved to Freiburg im Breisgau, died in 1994. From 1986 to 2001, Wilfried de Beauclair lived in Freiburg and from 2001 to 2017 with his daughter in Blaustein. He had been living in a retirement home in Ulm since 2017. On 4 April 2018 he celebrated his 106th birthday there, and was then the oldest citizen of the city of Ulm.
