= Maksym Kovalenko =

Ukrainian chemist and academic

Maksym V. Kovalenko
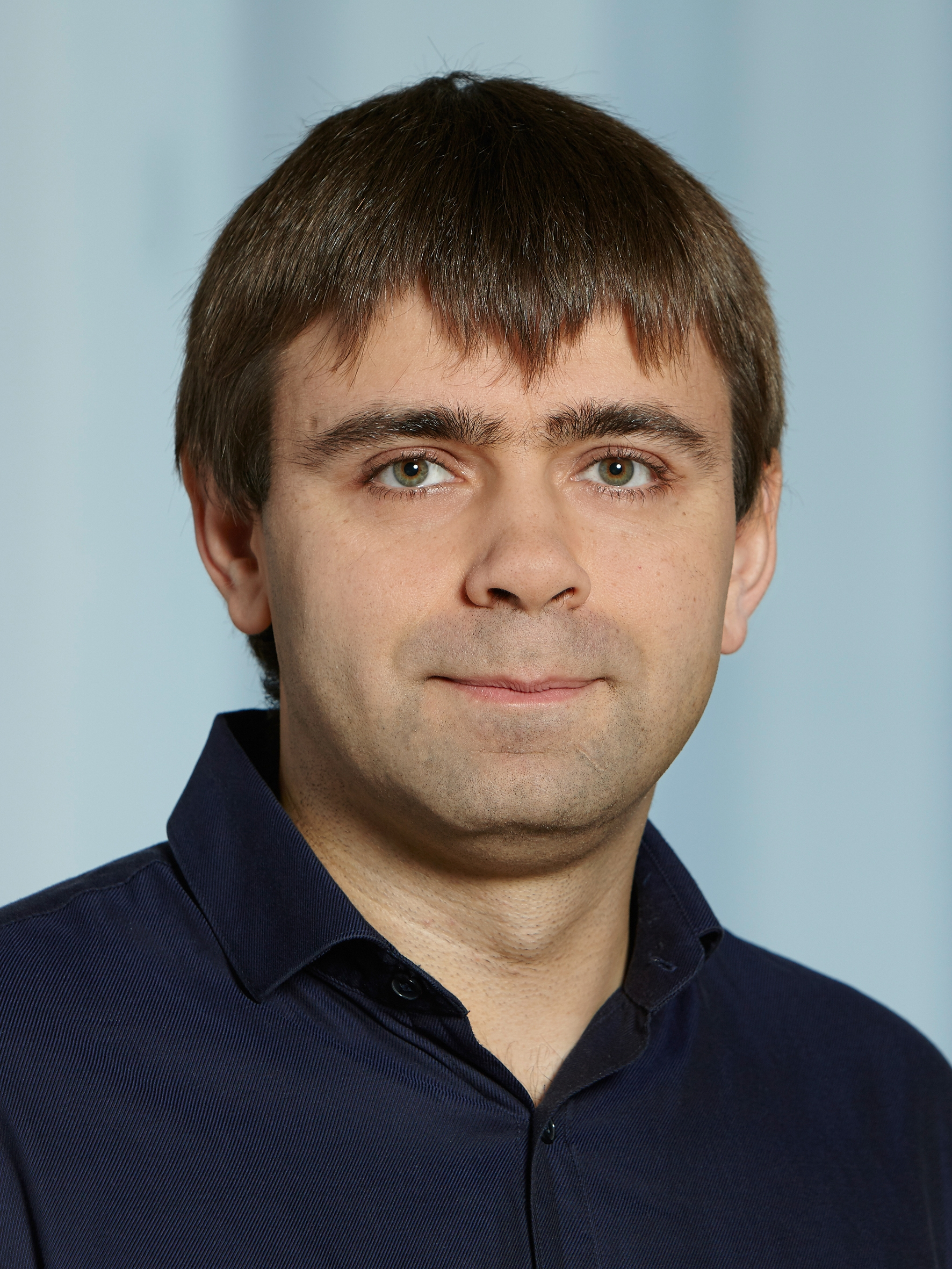
- Maksym Kovalenko in 2018
- Born: 1982 (age 43–44); Hola Prystan, Ukraine
- Education: Chernivtsi National University, Johannes Kepler Universitat Linz (Ph.D.)
- Occupation: Associate Professor of Chemistry
- Awards: Rössler Prize, Werner Prize, Ruzicka Preis
- Scientific career
- Workplaces: ETH Zurich, Empa, University of Chicago (postdoc)
- Notable students: Maria Ibáñez
- Website: Kovalenko Lab

Maksym V. Kovalenko (born 1982) is a full professor of inorganic chemistry and the head of the Functional Inorganic Materials group at ETH Zurich. A part of the research activities of the group are conducted at Empa (Dübendorf). He is working in the fields of solid-state chemistry, quantum dots and other nanomaterials, surface chemistry, self-assembly, optical spectroscopy, optoelectronics and energy storage.

== Early life and education ==
Maksym Kovalenko was born in 1982 in southern Ukraine. He grew up in the Ukrainian area of Bukovina. He studied chemistry at Chernivtsi National University. In 2007, Kovalenko obtained his Ph.D. at the Johannes Kepler University in Linz, Austria under the supervision of Prof. Dr. Wolfgang Heiss. During this time, he focused on narrow band gap quantum dots, and published several articles on HgTe, SnTe, PbSe as well as iron oxide nanocrystals. A part of these works was carried out at the Molecular Foundry (Lawrence Berkeley National Laboratory, USA).

== Academic career and research ==
After the completion of his Ph.D., he moved to the University of Chicago in Chicago, Illinois as a post-doctoral research assistant in the group of Prof. Dmitri Talapin. In 2009, Kovalenko published an article in Science describing the use of inorganic ligands on colloidal nanocrystals. Such an all-inorganic design of semiconductor nanocrystals had enabled their integration into diverse electronic and optoelectronic devices.

In 2011, Kovalenko accepted an assistant professorship at ETH Zurich in Zurich, Switzerland. Initially, the research group focused on the development of new synthetic approaches for nanocrystals and their utilization in rechargeable batteries and photodetectors. In 2015, the group introduced highly luminescent nanocrystals of cesium lead halide perovskites and shortly thereafter, in 2016–2017, formamidinium lead halide nanocrystals.

In 2016, Kovalenko received tenure and became an associate professor at ETH Zurich and continued to lead his research group at both ETH Zurich and Empa. Since then, the research group of Kovalenko has focused on understanding and improving colloidal perovskite nanocrystals, their assembly into long-range ordered superlattices and their exploration as quantum light sources. Additionally, the group continues to investigate the surface chemistry of nanocrystals and novel electrode materials for Li-ion and non-Li battery technologies. The group is increasingly active in the discovery of novel semiconductors and light emitters. In 2018, the group received financial support from the ETH+ Initiative to establish a crystal growth and characterization facility for research purposes as well as for education and training of students. The expertise of the group now also includes single-particle spectroscopy, fabrication of light-emitting diodes and testing materials for hard radiation detection.

In August 2020, Kovalenko was promoted to full professor at ETH Zurich.

=== Additional roles ===
Kovalenko currently serves as an associate editor for the journal Chemistry of Materials. He has served as the chair of the Institute of Inorganic Chemistry (LAC) at ETH Zurich from 2018 to 2019.

=== Awards and recognition ===
- Wheland Medal and Lectureship 2023
- Dan Maydan Prize in Nanoscience Research 2021
- Rössler Prize 2019
- Highly Cited Researcher 2019
- Highly Cited Researcher 2018
- ERC Consolidator Grant 2018
- Werner Prize 2016
- Ruzicka Prize 2013
- ERC Starting Grant 2012
