= Rössler Prize =

Scientific award for a young tenured professor at ETH Zurich

- Awarded for: Outstanding scientific work
- Sponsored by: ETH Zurich Foundation
- Location: Zürich
- Country: Switzerland
- First award: 2009; 17 years ago
- Website: https://www.ethz-foundation.ch/en/roessler-prize/

The Rössler Prize, offered by the ETH Zurich Foundation, is a monetary prize that has been awarded annually since 2009 to a promising young tenured professor of the ETH Zurich in the middle of an accelerating career. The prize of 200,000 Swiss Francs is financed by the returns from an endowment made by Max Rössler, an alumnus of the ETH. The prize money has to be used for the research of the laureate.

== Laureates ==
- 2009: Nenad Ban, Microbiology
- 2010: Gerald Haug, Geology of Climate
- 2011: Andreas Wallraff, Solid State Physics
- 2012: Nicola Spaldin, Material Science
- 2013: Olivier Voinnet, RNA Biology
- 2014: Christian Wolfrum, Health Sciences and Technology
- 2015: David J. Norris, Mechanical and Process Engineering
- 2016: Christophe Copéret, Chemistry and Applied Biosciences
- 2017: Olga Sorkine-Hornung, Computer Science
- 2018: Philippe Block, Architecture
- 2019: Maksym Kovalenko, Inorganic chemistry/Nanotechnology
- 2020: Paola Picotti, Biology
- 2021: Andreas Krause (computer scientist), Machine Learning
- 2022: Tanja Stadler, Mathematics and Computational evolutionary biology
- 2023: Siddhartha Mishra, Mathematics
- 2024: Marco Hutter, Robotics
- 2025: Florian Dörfler (Elektroingenieur), Control engineering
- 2026: Jeremy Richardson, Chemist

== See also ==
- Science and technology in Switzerland
- Prizes named after people
