= Heinz Rutishauser =

Swiss mathematician and computer scientist (1918–1970)

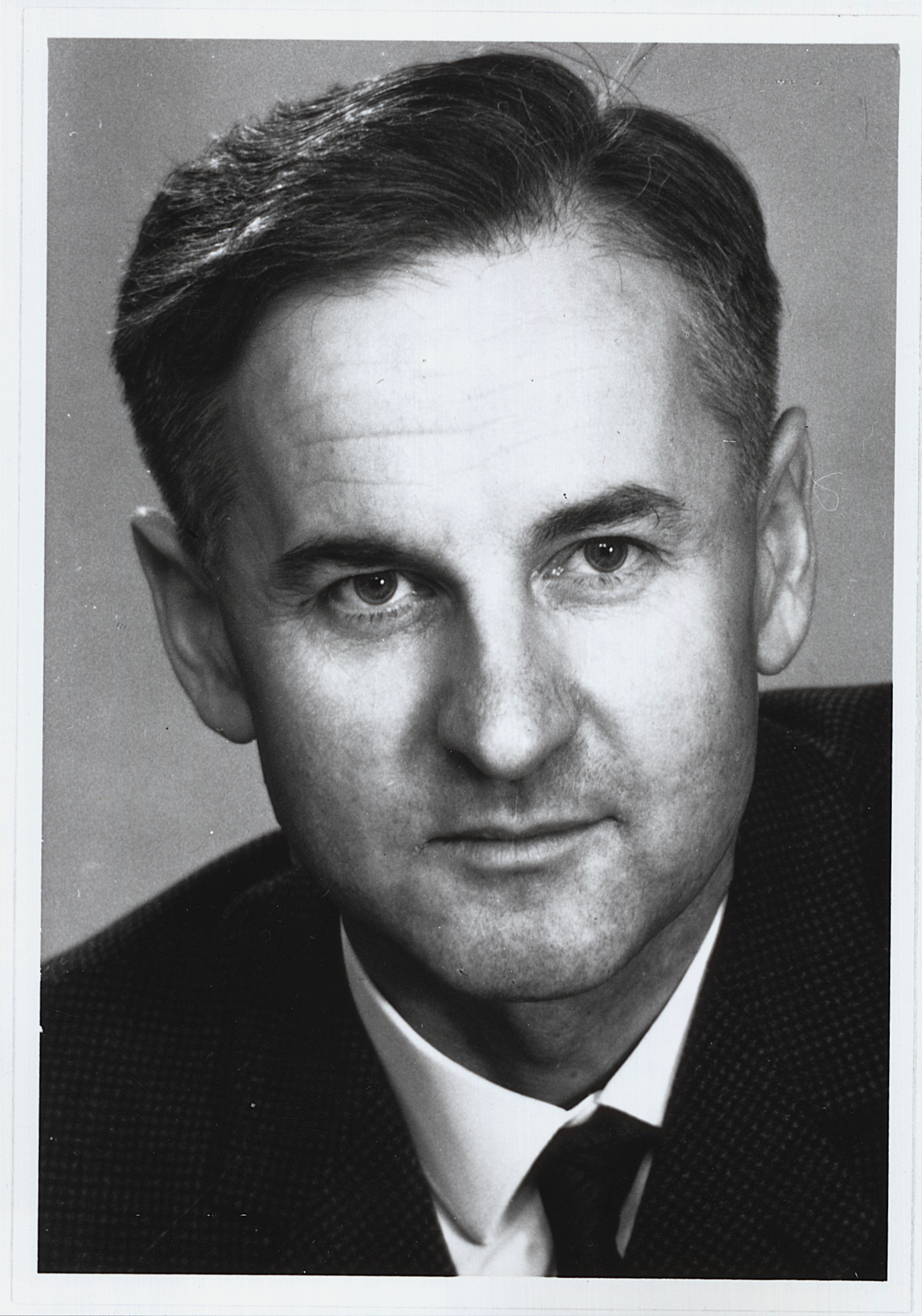
- Rutishauser c. 1960
- Born: 30 January 1918; Weinfelden, Switzerland
- Died: 10 November 1970 (aged 52); Zürich
- Education: ETH Zürich
- Known for: Superplan; ALGOL
- Scientific career
- Fields: Mathematics; Computer science
- Workplaces: ETH Zürich
- Thesis: Über Folgen und Scharen von analytischen und meromorphen Funktionen mehrerer Variabeln, sowie von analytischen Abbildungen
- Doctoral advisors: Walter Saxer; Albert Pfluger

Heinz Rutishauser (30 January 1918 – 10 November 1970) was a Swiss mathematician and a pioneer of modern numerical mathematics and computer science.

== Life ==
Rutishauser's father died when he was 13 years old and his mother died three years later, so together with his younger brother and sister he went to live in their uncle's home. From 1936, Rutishauser studied mathematics at the ETH Zürich where he graduated in 1942. From 1942 to 1945, he was assistant of Walter Saxer at the ETH, and from 1945 to 1948, a mathematics teacher in Glarisegg and Trogen. In 1948, he received his Doctor of Philosophy (PhD) from ETH with a well-received thesis on complex analysis.

From 1948 to 1949, Rutishauser was in the United States at the Universities of Harvard and Princeton to study the state of the art in computing. From 1949 to 1955, he was a research associate at the Institute for Applied Mathematics at ETH Zürich recently founded by Eduard Stiefel, where he worked together with Ambros Speiser on developing the first Swiss computer ERMETH, and developed the programming language Superplan (1949–1951), the name being a reference to Rechenplan (English: computation plan), in Konrad Zuse's terminology, designating a single Plankalkül program. He contributed especially in the field of compiler pioneering work and was eventually involved in defining the languages ALGOL 58 and ALGOL 60. He was a member of the International Federation for Information Processing (IFIP) IFIP Working Group 2.1 on Algorithmic Languages and Calculi, which specified, maintains, and supports ALGOL 60 and ALGOL 68.

Among other contributions, he introduced several basic syntactic features to computer programming, notably the reserved word (keyword) for for a for loop, first as the German für in Superplan, next via its English translation for in ALGOL 58.

In 1951, Rutishauser became a lecturer; in German, a Privatdozent. In 1955, he was appointed extraordinary professor, and 1962, Associate Professor of Applied Mathematics at the ETH. In 1968, he became the head of the Group for Computer Science which later became the Computer Science Institute and ultimately in 1981, The Division of Computer Science at ETH Zürich.

At least since the 1950s Rutishauser suffered from heart problems. In 1964, he suffered a heart attack from which he recovered. On 10 November 1970, he died in his office from acute heart failure. After his untimely death, his wife Margaret shepherded the publication of his posthumous works.

In the preface to his text Systematic Programming: An Introduction, Niklaus Wirth referred to Rutishauser as "... the originator of the idea of programming languages, and the co-author of ALGOL-60".

== Papers ==
- Automatische Rechenplanfertigung. Habilitationsschrift ETHZ, 1951. (i.e. Automatic construction of computation plans, habilitation thesis)
- Automatische Rechenplanfertigung bei programmgesteuerten Rechenmaschinen. Basel: Birkhäuser, 1952.
- Some programming techniques for the ERMETH, JACM, 2(1), pp. 1–4, Januar 1955.
- Der Quotienten-Differenzen-Algorithmus. Basel: Birkhäuser, 1957.
- Vorlesungen über numerische Mathematik. Band I: Gleichungssysteme, Interpolation und Approximation. Martin Gutknecht (Hrsg.). Basel: Birkhäuser, 1976. ISBN 3-7643-0810-9.
- Vorlesungen über numerische Mathematik. Band II: Differentialgleichungen und Eigenwertprobleme. Martin Gutknecht (Hrsg.). Basel: Birkhäuser, 1976. ISBN 3-7643-0850-8.
- Heinz Rutishauser, Ambros Paul Speiser, Eduard Stiefel: Programmgesteuerte digitale Rechengeräte (elektronische Rechenmaschinen). Basel: Birkhäuser, 1951.
- Hans Rudolf Schwarz, Heinz Rutishauser, Eduard Stiefel: Numerik symmetrischer Matrizen. Stuttgart: Teubner, 1972, 2. Auflage, ISBN 3-519-12311-8.
- Numerische Prozeduren. Aus Nachlass und Lehre. Walter Gander (Hrsg.). Basel: Birkhäuser, Mai 1998, ISBN 3-7643-0874-5.

== Literature ==
- Friedrich Ludwig Bauer (2005). "Rutishauser, Heinz". Neue Deutsche Biographie (in German). Vol. 22. Berlin: Duncker & Humblot. pp. 305–305.
