= Superplan =

Programming language with strong abstraction from details of hardware

- Designed by: Heinz Rutishauser
- First appeared: 1951

Influenced by
- Plankalkül

Influenced
- ALGOL 58

Superplan was a high-level programming language developed between 1949 and 1951 by Heinz Rutishauser, the name being a reference to "Rechenplan" (i.e. computation plan), in Konrad Zuse's terminology designating a single Plankalkül program.

The language was described in Rutishauser's 1951 publication Über automatische Rechenplanfertigung bei programmgesteuerten Rechenmaschinen (i.e. Automatically created Computation Plans for Program-Controlled Computing Machines).

Superplan introduced the keyword für as for loop, which had the following form ($a_i$ being an array item):

Für i=base(increment)limit: 
  
    
      
        
          a
          
            i
          
        
      
    
    {\displaystyle a_{i}}
  
 + addend = 
  
    
      
        
          a
          
            i
          
        
      
    
    {\displaystyle a_{i}}
  

== See also ==
- Compiler
- Translator
