= Philippe Bouyer =

French physicist (born 1969)

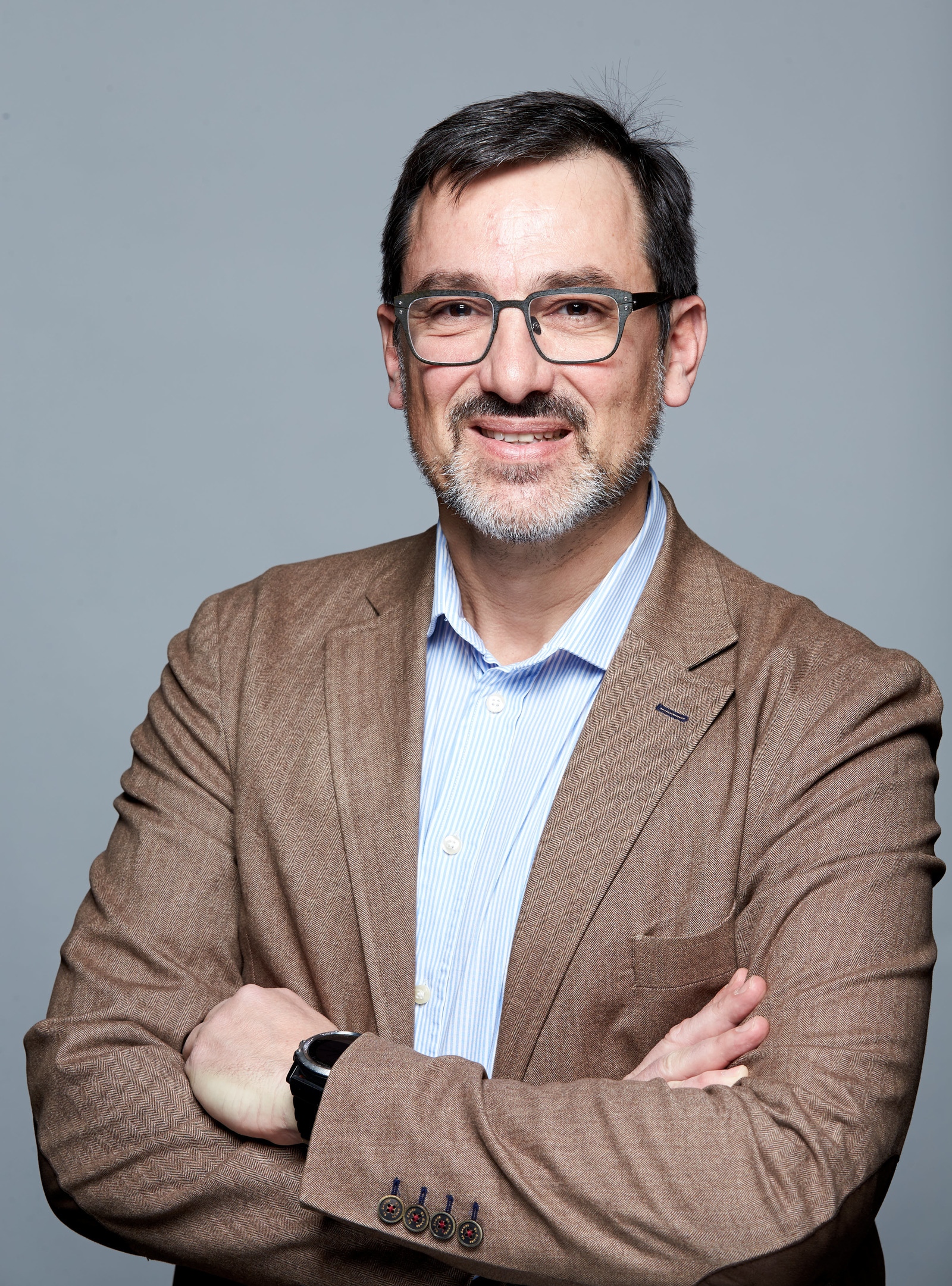
- Education: Institut d'Optique; Laboratoire Kastler Brossel
- Scientific career
- Fields: physics

Philippe Bouyer (born 7 March 1969) is a French physicist and researcher, professor at the University of Amsterdam and the Technical University of Eindhoven, and chairman of the Dutch Quantum Initiative, Quantum Delta NL. He co-founded Muquans, acquired later by Exail, a company specializing in quantum technology-based gravimeters.

From 2011 to 2022, Bouyer was the founding director of the Laboratory for Photonics, Numerics, and Nano-sciences (LP2N) in Talence, France. He also was deputy director of the Institut d'Optique Graduate School from 2017 to 2022. Since 2019, he has been the Editor-in-Chief of AVS Quantum Science, a journal published by AIP Publishing in partnership with the American Vacuum Society.

Bouyer is a graduate of the Institut d'Optique Graduate School, and he obtained his PhD in 1994 from the Laboratoire Kastler Brossel at the École Normale Supérieure. After joining the French National Center for Scientific Research (CNRS), his research concentrated on ultracold atoms, atom lasers, and Anderson localization. His current research interests include matter-wave interferometry for testing general relativity in microgravity conditions and the detection of gravitational waves.

In 2012, Bouyer received the Louis D. Award from the Institut de France for his scientific contributions. He is also a Fellow of the American Physical Society (APS) and a senior member of the Optical Society of America (OSA).
