= Max Rössler =

Swiss investor and patron (1940–2026)

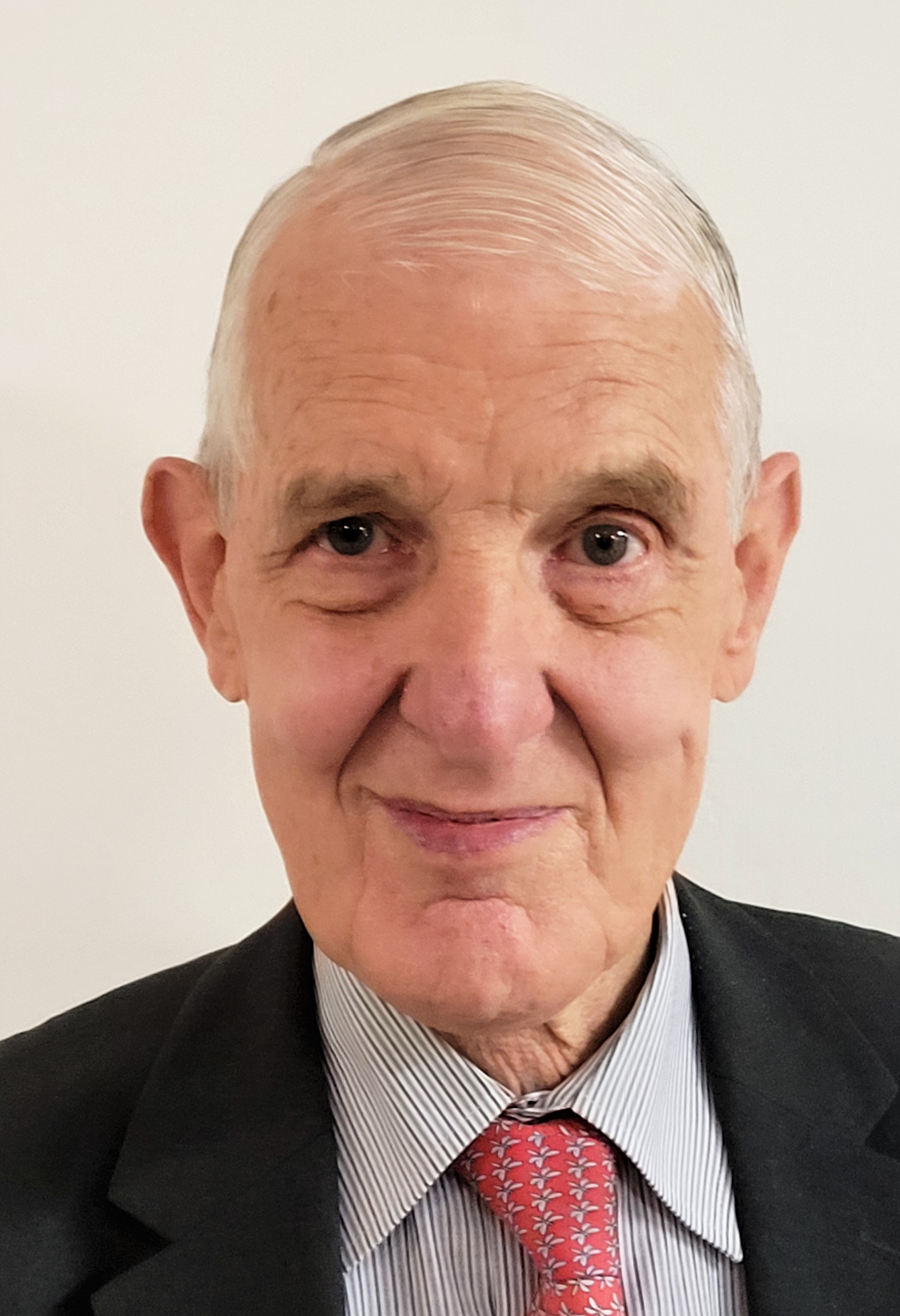
- Rössler in 2021
- Education: ETH Zurich
- Occupations: mathematician, investor

Max Rössler (1940 – 2026) was a Swiss investor and philanthropist that had invested in a number of businesses in Switzerland and was on the board of a number of those companies. He had used his private wealth to donate to a number of causes including sponsoring the annual Rössler Prize at his old alma mater.

== Early life and education ==
Rössler attended the Kantonsschule at Burggraben in St. Gallen, where he finished his matriculation. He then studied mathematics at ETH Zurich, where he co-authored a dissertation on railway computations in the field of space mechanics in 1966 with Eduard Stiefel. He then spent time at Harvard University in Cambridge, Massachusetts, for a NASA research project to calculate space travel. Subsequently, he was a lecturer for applied mathematics and operations research at ETH Zurich.

== Career and investments ==
In 1978 Rössler changed to finances. He was responsible for the analysis department of fixed interest investments and the management of investment funds of CHF 12 billion at the Schweizerische Kreditanstalt. Later he was responsible for financial investments of the Swiss Accident Insurance Institution (SUVA). He successfully used his knowledge in the financial sector for his own investments, to which a considerable amount of his assets includes investments in several Swiss companies.

He was the main shareholder of the Parmino Holding AG which included the construction company Implenia. Through his influence on the occupation of the Implenia management team, Rössler became well known to the public. Rössler sold the majority of his Implenia shares in April 2024.

In addition, Rössler held a major stake in the machine tool business Starrag Group and was a board member of other companies such as RSB Securities AG, Global Care and SunVesta Holding. He was also an advisor to Swiss private banks. Rössler was a member of the Board of Trustees at the Rütli Foundation, which is affiliated to the private bank Reichmuth & Co.

== Rössler Prize ==
His private wealth enabled him to donate largely. In 2009, Rössler funded the annual Rössler Prize for the support of outstanding young professors at the ETH Zurich. The prize money amounts to CHF 200,000. Another major donation, together with the Walter Haefner Foundation, enabled the founding of the new Institute for Theoretical Studies at ETH Zurich 2013.

== Awards ==
- 2013: Honorary Council of the ETH Zurich
