= Seminar for Applied Mathematics =

The Seminar for Applied Mathematics (SAM; from 1948 to 1969 Institute for Applied Mathematics) was founded in 1948 by Prof. Eduard Stiefel. It is part of the Department of Mathematics (D-MATH) of the Swiss Federal Institute of Technology, ETH Zurich. The Seminar consists of four regular professorships (as of 2014), two assistant professorships, two permanent senior scientists, approximately 14 positions for assistants which are either filled by senior assistants, postdoctoral fellows or Ph.D. students, as well as secretarial staff and a systems administrator.

It is represented by the Head of SAM. The SAM is a center for research and teaching in numerical mathematics, mathematical modelling and computing in Science and Technology in the D-MATH of the ETH Zürich.

== Mission ==
- To conduct fundamental research in the development and mathematical analysis of efficient discretizations for problems in engineering and the sciences as well as their implementation on supercomputers
- To provide education in applied mathematics, numerics and scientific computing on all levels
- To help bridge gaps between computational directions in engineering and the sciences and those in the mathematical community
- To provide a consulting service in all areas of numerical mathematics to ETH as a whole, and also to government agencies and industry
