= Outline of information technology =

Overview of and topical guide to information technology

The following outline is provided as an overview of and topical guide to information technology:

Information technology (IT) – microelectronics based combination of computing and telecommunications technology to treat information, including in the acquisition, processing, storage and dissemination of vocal, pictorial, textual and numerical information. It is defined by the Information Technology Association of America (ITAA) as "the study, design, development, implementation, support or management of computer-based information systems, particularly toward software applications and computer hardware."

== Different names ==
There are different names for this at different periods or through fields. Some of these names are:

- ICT – Information and communication technologies
- IT – Information technology
- DCT – Data Communication & technology
- CDT – Creative digital technology
- DT – Design & technology
- Communication technology
- Hacker

== Underlying technology ==
- MOSFET (MOS transistor)
  - Semiconductor device fabrication
  - PMOS (p-type MOS)
  - NMOS (n-type MOS)
  - CMOS (complementary MOS)
  - Floating-gate MOSFET (FGMOS)
  - Silicon-gate transistor (SGT)
  - Power MOSFET
  - Multi-gate field-effect transistor (MuGFET)
    - FinFET (fin field-effect transistor)
  - Thin-film transistor (TFT)
- Integrated circuit (IC)
  - Hybrid integrated circuit (HIC)
  - Monolithic integrated circuit (IC) chip
    - Planar process
    - MOS integrated circuit (MOS IC)
    - Silicon-gate technology (SGT) MOS IC
  - Three-dimensional integrated circuit (3D IC)
- Computer memory
  - Semiconductor memory
  - Random-access memory (RAM)
    - Static random-access memory (SRAM)
    - Dynamic random-access memory (DRAM)
    - Synchronous DRAM (SDRAM)
  - Nonvolatile memory (NVM)
    - Read-only memory (ROM)
    - Programmable ROM (PROM)
    - Floating-gate memory
    - EPROM (erasable PROM)
    - EEPROM (electrically erasable PROM)
    - Flash memory
  - Magnetic-core memory
- Microprocessor
  - Central processing unit (CPU)
  - Graphics processing unit (GPU)
  - Digital signal processor (DSP)
  - Image signal processor (ISP)

== History of information technology ==
- History of computing
  - History of computing, by subject
    - History of computing hardware
    - History of computing hardware (1960s–present)
    - History of computer hardware in Eastern Bloc countries
    - History of artificial intelligence
    - History of computer science
    - History of operating systems
    - History of programming languages
    - History of software engineering
    - History of the graphical user interface
    - History of the Internet
    - History of personal computers
    - History of laptops
    - History of video games
    - History of the World Wide Web
  - Timeline of computing
    - Timeline of computing hardware 2400 BC–1949
    - Timeline of computing 1950–1979
    - Timeline of computing 1980–1989
    - Timeline of computing 1990–1999
    - Timeline of computing 2000–2009

== Information technology education and certification ==
=== IT degrees ===
- BSIT or B.Sc. IT – Bachelor of Science in Information Technology
- M.Sc. IT, MSc IT or MSIT – Master of Science in Information Technology
- BCA – Bachelor of Computer Applications
- MCA – Master of Computer Applications

=== Vendor-specific certifications ===
- Amazon Web Services has 5 certifications
- Apple Inc. – sponsors the Apple certification program
- Avaya Professional Credential Program
- Cisco Systems – sponsors the Cisco Career Certifications program
- Citrix Systems – sponsors the Citrix Certified Administrator program
- Hewlett-Packard – sponsors the HP-CP certifications related to HP Technologies
- Dell – sponsors the Dell Certified Systems Expert program with Associate and Master levels
- Huawei – sponsors certifications
- IBM – sponsors certifications
- Juniper Networks – sponsors the Juniper Networks Technical Certification Program
- LANDesk – sponsors the Certified LANDesk Administrator and Certified LANDesk Engineer program
- Microsoft Corporation – sponsors the Microsoft Certified Professional program
- MySQL (as part of Oracle Corporation now) – sponsors a certification program
- NetApp – sponsors the NetApp Certification program
- Nortel – sponsors the Nortel Certifications program
- Novell – sponsors a certification program
- Object Management Group – sponsors the Certified Professional program for the Unified Modeling Language
- Oracle Corporation – sponsors the Oracle Certification Program
- Red Hat – sponsors the Red Hat Certification Program
- SAP – sponsors individual training and certifications
- SolarWinds – sponsors the SolarWinds Certified Professional Program for network management
- Sun Microsystems – sponsors the Sun Certified Professional program
- Sybase – sponsors the Certified Sybase Professional program
- VMware – sponsors certification programs (VCP & VCDX)
- Zend Technologies – sponsors the Zend Certified Engineer program

=== Third-party and vendor-neutral certifications ===
Third-party commercial organizations and vendor neutral interest groups that sponsor certifications include:

- XML Certification Program - XML Master
- Certiport – sponsors the Microsoft Office Specialist and IC3 certification (Internet and Computing Core).
- CompTIA (Computing Technology Industry Association) – offers 12 professional IT Certifications, validating foundation-level IT knowledge and skills.
- European Computer Driving License-Foundation – sponsors the European Computer Driving License (also called International Computer Driving License) (ICDL)
- International Information and Communication Technology Council Certification Program
- (ISC)² – sponsors the CISSP, SSCP and other security certifications
- Linux Professional Institute
- Majinate sponsors the Accredited Symbian Developer scheme for Symbian OS
- NACSE (National Association of Communication Systems Engineers) sponsors 36 Vendor Neutral, knowledge specific, Certifications covering the 5 major IT Disciplines which are: Data Networking, Telecomm, Web Design & Development, Programming & Business Skills for IT Professionals.
- The Open Group – sponsors TOGAF certification and the IT Architect Certification (ITAC) and IT Specialist Certification (ITSC) skills and experience based IT certifications.
- Planet3 Wireless – sponsors the Certified Wireless Network Administrator (CWNA) certification
- SAGE (organization) – sponsors the cSAGE program
- SANS Institute – operates the Global Information Assurance Certification program

=== General certification ===
General certification of software practitioners has struggled. The ACM had a professional certification program in the early 1980s, which was discontinued due to lack of interest. Today, the IEEE is certifying software professionals, but only about 500 people have passed the exam by March 2005.

- The IEEE Computer Society – sponsors the Certified Software Development Professional as well as membership designations, "Senior" and "Fellow" which reflect experience and peer review qualification.
- The IET – sponsors the Chartered Engineer and Incorporated Engineer, which can be ratified into the European Engineer
- The BCS – sponsors the Chartered IT Professional (CITP) programme.
- The Institute for Certification of Computing Professionals sponsors the Certified Computing Professional (CCP) and Associate Computing Professional (ACP) certifications
- The BDPA IT Institute – sponsors the BDPA IT Associate (BITA), the BDPA IT Professional (BITP), and the BDPA IT Master (BITM) certifications
- The Canadian Information Processing Society – sponsors the Information Systems Professional certification in Canada.
- The American Institute of Certified Public Accountants – sponsors the Certified Information Technology Professional program.
- APICS – establishes operations management standards and sponsors certification for Logistics

== Information technology and society ==
- E democracy

=== Software Testing ===
- British Computer Society
- National Software Testing Laboratories
- American Society for Quality § Certifications
- ISTQB
- CSTE
