= Outline of computer engineering =

Overview of and topical guide to computer engineering

The following outline is provided as an overview of and topical guide to computer engineering:

Computer engineering – discipline that integrates several fields of electrical engineering and computer science required to develop computer hardware and software. Computer engineers usually have training in electronic engineering (or electrical engineering), software design, and hardware–software integration instead of only software engineering or electronic engineering. Computer engineers are involved in many hardware and software aspects of computing, from the design of individual microcontrollers, microprocessors, personal computers, and supercomputers, to circuit design. This field of engineering not only focuses on how computer systems themselves work, but also how they integrate into the larger picture.

== Main articles on computer engineering ==
- Computer
  - Computer architecture
  - Computer hardware
  - Computer software
- Computer science
- Engineering
  - Electrical engineering
  - Electronics and Computer Engineering
  - Software engineering

== History of computer engineering ==
=== General ===
- Time line of computing 2400 BC - 1949 - 1950–1979 - 1980–1989 - 1990–1999 - 2000–2009
- History of computing hardware up to third generation (1960s)
- History of computing hardware from 1960s to current
- History of computer hardware in Eastern Bloc countries
- History of personal computers
- History of laptops
- History of software engineering
- History of compiler writing
- History of the Internet
- History of the World Wide Web
- History of video games
- History of the graphical user interface
- Timeline of computing
- Timeline of operating systems
- Timeline of programming languages
- Timeline of artificial intelligence
- Timeline of cryptography
- Timeline of algorithms
- Timeline of quantum computing

=== Product specific ===
- Timeline of DOS operating systems
- Classic Mac OS
- History of macOS
- History of Microsoft Windows
- Timeline of the Apple II series
- Timeline of Apple products
- Timeline of file sharing
- Timeline of OpenBSD

== Hardware ==
- Digital electronics
- Very-large-scale integration
- Hardware description language
- Application-specific integrated circuit
- Electrical network
- Microprocessor

== Software ==
- Assembly language
- Operating system
- Database
- Software engineering

== System design ==
- Computer architecture
- Microarchitecture
- Multiprocessing
- Computer performance by orders of magnitude

== Interdisciplinary fields ==
- Human–computer interaction
- Computer network
- Digital signal processing
- Control theory

== See also ==
- Computer Science
- List of basic information technology topics
