= Timeline of computing before 1950 =

This article presents a detailed timeline of events in the history of computing: from prehistory until 1949. For narratives explaining the overall developments, see History of computing.

== Prehistory ==
Date	Event
35,000 BCE	Approximate date of the Lebombo bone, a piece of baboon fibula with twenty-nine notches that resemble calendar sticks still used by the San of Namibia. This may represent the earliest mathematical artifact.
8,000 BCE	Latest date of the Ishango bone, which appears to exhibit tallying marks, hypothesized as a lunar phase count or as an arithmetical game.

== Before modernity ==
=== Antiquity ===
Date	Event
c. 2300 BC	Latest estimated date for the invention of the Sumerian abacus.It was a wooden or clay board divided into columns labeled with the orders of magnitude of a base-60 number system and operated with uniform tokens.
before 1600 BC	The Senkereh Tablet is produced, which contains a list of squares and was probably used as a ready reckoner.
c. 400 BC	Date given by Sinologist Joseph Needham for the invention of the armillary sphere.
c. 400 BC	The estimated date of construction for the oldest surviving counting board, made in white marble on the island of Salamis.
c. 1st century BC	Date given by Sinologist Christopher Cullen for the invention of the armillary sphere.
c. 125 BC	The Antikythera mechanism: A clockwork, analog computer believed to have been designed and built in the Corinthian colony of Syracuse. The mechanism contained a differential gear and was capable of tracking the relative positions of all then-known heavenly bodies.
2nd century AD	Apuleius of Madaura creates the earliest known depiction of the square of opposition, based on Aristotle's logic. Irving H. Anellis describes the square of opposition as an ancient contribution to the graphical aspect of automated theorem proving.
3rd century AD	Lifetime of Porphyry of Tyre, a Phoenecian Platonist philosopher who developed the Porphyrian tree. Irving H. Anellis describes this as a precursor to the graphical aspect of automated theorem proving.
before 405 AD	Theon of Alexandria (c. 335–405) wrote a treatise on the astrolabe, now lost but referred to by the Suda and some Arabic sources.

=== Medieval ===
Date	Event
725	Bede writes De Temporum Ratione, a treatise on early medieval computus which describes a method of finger reckoning.
844	Pacificus of Verona, head of the scriptorium at Verona Cathedral, dies. He invented a horologium nocturnum (a sort of nocturnal astrolabe) which consisted of a sighting tube and disk.
850	The Banū Mūsā brothers, in their Book of Ingenious Devices, invented "the earliest known mechanical musical instrument", in this case a hydropowered organ which played interchangeable cylinders automatically. This "cylinder with raised pins on the surface remained the basic device to produce and reproduce music mechanically until the second half of the nineteenth century." They also invented an automatic flute player which appears to have been the first programmable machine.
c. 980	Gerbert of Aurillac, later Pope Silvester II, writes a short tract on the abacus, Regulae de numerorum abaci rationibus. Gerbert's abacus was a large table of 27 columns, used with jetons inscribed with characters. It could express the value of any number from $10^0$ to $10^{26}$. It is likely that Gerbert introduced the practice of marking counters with Arabic numberals, however none of the surviving early texts include diagrams of the instrument. An abacus board on the Echternach Bible may be an example of Gerbert's abacus, based on descriptions by his pupil Richer and the Liber abaci of Bernelinus of Paris. According to Thietmar of Merseburg, Gerbert also developed a tube (fistula) and "observed the guide star of the mariners" (stella nautarum duce), which may be a description of a nocturnal astrolabe.
c. 1000	Abū Rayhān al-Bīrūnī invents a form of orthographic astrolabe. He also described a mechanical lunisolar calendar, the "Box of the Moon", apparently derived from Hellenistic or Byzantine precursors, which employed a gear train and eight gear-wheels.
c. 1080 AD	The earliest attestation of the south-pointing chariot. They may have been made during the Han dynasty; legendary accounts attribute its invention to the Yellow Emperor and Zhou Gong in antiquity.
c. 1081	Arab astronomer, Abū Ishāq Ibrāhīm al-Zarqālī (Arzachel) of al-Andalus, composes two treatises on the construction and use of the equatorium. His differs from the earlier model design by Ibn-al-Samh in that it represents all the planetary deferents on a single plate, and a second plate bears the epicycles.
12th century	Hugo of Santalla translates or writes the Ars geomantiae, which introduces geomancy into Europe. Geomancy, a form of divination which involves the addition and transposition of binary figures, forms an Abelian group over those figures. For this reason, the mathematician Maino Pedrazzi calls it perhaps "the first algebraicized science".
c. 1150	Arab astronomer, Jabir ibn Aflah (Geber), may have invented or inspired the torquetum. It was designed to take and convert measurements made in three sets of coordinates: horizon, equatorial, and ecliptic.
1202	Leonardo Pisano Bigollo, better known as Fibonacci completes the Liber Abaci. This book contains an explanation of the Hindu-Arabic numeral system, an algorithm for multiplication, and discussions of arithmetic series and proportions of numbers.
1206	Arab engineer, Al-Jazari, invented numerous automata and made numerous other technological innovations. One of these is a design for a programmable humanoid-shaped mannequin: this seems to have been the first serious, scientific (as opposed to magical) plan for a robot. He also invented the "castle clock", an astronomical clock which is considered to be the earliest programmable analog computer. It displayed the zodiac, the solar and lunar orbits, a crescent moon-shaped pointer travelling across a gateway causing automatic doors to open every hour, and five robotic musicians who play music when struck by levers operated by a camshaft attached to a water wheel. The length of day and night could be re-programmed every day in order to account for the changing lengths of day and night throughout the year.
1235	Persian astronomer Abi Bakr of Isfahan invented a brass astrolabe with a geared calendar movement based on the design of Abū Rayhān al-Bīrūnī's mechanical calendar analog computer. Abi Bakr's geared astrolabe uses a set of gear-wheels and is the oldest surviving complete mechanical geared machine in existence.
1259	The death of Matthew Paris and thus the final entry in his Chronica majora, a chronicle he composed at St. Albans Abbey. The original autograph (Cambridge, Corpus Christi College, Ms. 26) contains perhaps the earliest example of a volvelle, Ronald I. Ives describes volvelles as "a form of circular slide-rule", while Nick Kanas calls them early paper astronomical computers.
c. 1274	Ramon Llull composes the Ars compendiosa inveniendi veritatem, the first stage of his combinatorial art. Llull is often identified as a forefather of computer science for his algorithmic and semi-mechanical approach to reasoning, which influenced Leibniz. Anthony Bonner identified elements of graph theory and lattice theory in the early phases of his work. Irving H. Anellis describes Llull's diagrams as a medieval contribution to the graphical aspect of automated theorem proving. Jessica Helfand writes that Llull's "then-unorthodox views on logic reflect perhaps our earliest record of hypertextual thinking, predating Vannevar Bush by a good 600 years".
1326	Richard of Wallingford develops the Rectangulus and Albion, astronomical instruments intended to improve on the armillary sphere, astrolabe, and torquetum. H. A. Evesham identifies the Rectangulus as a precursor to nomography.
c. 1416	Jamshīd al-Kāshī invented the Plate of Conjunctions, an instrument used to determine the time of day at which planetary conjunctions will occur, and for performing linear interpolation. He also invented a mechanical "planetary computer" which he called the Plate of Zones, which could graphically solve a number of planetary problems, including the prediction of the true positions in longitude of the Sun and Moon, and the planets; the latitudes of the Sun, Moon, and planets; and the ecliptic of the Sun. The instrument also incorporated an alhidade and ruler.

== Early modernity ==
Date	Event
1466	Leon Battista Alberti composes De cifris, which describes a polyalphabetic cipher mechanized by two concentric rotating discs. Historian David Kahn hypothesized that he could have been influenced by Ramon Llull.
1493	Leonardo da Vinci produced drawings of a device consisting of interlocking cog wheels which can be interpreted as a mechanical calculator capable of addition and subtraction. A working model inspired by this plan was built in 1968 but it remains controversial whether Leonardo really had a calculator in mind. Da Vinci also made plans for a mechanical man: an early design for a robot.
c. 1499	Abbot and polymath Johannes Trithemius writes the first book-length description of cryptography, itself encrypted as a book on the conjuration of spirits.
1567	Fabrizio Mordente publishes a treatise on a proportional compass he invented.
1617	Scotsman John Napier describes a set of rods for calculation in his Rabdologiae, commonly called Napier's bones but also referred to as numbering rods, multiplying rulers, or speaking rods based on the lattice or gelosia multiplication algorithm. The same work also introduces a chessboard-based binary calculator.
c. 1622	William Oughtred developed slide rules based on logarithms as developed by John Napier and Gunter's line as developed by Edmund Gunter.
1623	German polymath Wilhelm Schickard drew a device that he called a calculating clock on two letters that he sent to Johannes Kepler; one in 1623 and the other in 1624. A fire later destroyed the machine as it was being built in 1624 and he decided to abandon his project. This machine became known to the world only in 1957 when the two letters were discovered. Some replicas were built in 1961. This machine had no impact on the development of mechanical calculators.
1642	French polymath Blaise Pascal invented the mechanical calculator. Called machine arithmétique, Pascal's calculator and eventually Pascaline, its public introduction in 1645 started the development of mechanical calculators first in Europe and then in the rest of the world. It was the first machine to have a controlled carry mechanism. Pascal built 50 prototypes before releasing his first machine (eventually twenty machines were built). The Pascaline inspired the works of Gottfried Leibniz (1671), Thomas de Colmar (1820) and Dorr E. Felt (1887).
1650	The German Jesuit and Llullist Athanasius Kircher publishes his Musurgia universalis, which contains a description of a computing device for music composition (the Arca musarithmica).
1663	Morland invents the Macina Cyclologica Trigonometrica, an instrument for trigonometry composed of three rulers set into a divided circle that could be operated by dials.
1666	The date given on the surviving example of Morland's multiplication device, though it may have been constructed as early as 1662. Its mechanism is driven by gears, ratcheted arms, sliding pins, and other mechanical means. In this same year, he invented an adding machine which, in the largest models, could add in both decimal and non-decimal (imperial) units. He also published A New Method of Cryptography, which describes a cryptographic machine, the Machina Cyclologica Cryptographica, that can perform an autokey encryption.
1667	Sir Charles Cotterell modifies a set of bones with a tiny abacus and a brass cursor for ease of use.
1672	Morland publishes The Description and Use of Two Arithmetic Instruments, which describes mechanical computers based on Napier's bones.
1672	German mathematician, Gottfried Leibniz started designing a machine which multiplied, the 'Stepped Reckoner'. It could multiply numbers of up to 5 and 12 digits to give a 16 digit result. Two machines were built, one in 1694 (it was discovered in an attic in 1879), and one in 1706.
1678	Rene Grillet combines Napier's bones with principles derived from the Pascaline to develop a new form of mechanical calculator.
1685	In an article titled "Machina arithmetica in qua non additio tantum et subtractio sed et multiplicatio nullo, diviso vero paene nullo animi labore peragantur", Gottfried Leibniz described a machine that used wheels with movable teeth which, when coupled to a Pascaline, could perform all four mathematical operations. There is no evidence that Leibniz ever constructed this pinwheel machine.
1697	Leibniz, in a birthday message to Rudolph Augustus, Duke of Braunschweig-Wolfenbüttel, introduces binary arithmetic. While he is preceded in this by Thomas Harriot and Juan Caramuel y Lobkowitz, it was Leibniz who transmitted them to scholarly culture. Leibniz, for his own part, believed that he was preceded by the trigrams of the Yijing.
1709	Giovanni Poleni was the first to build a calculator that used a pinwheel design. It was made of wood and was built in the shape of a calculating clock.
1775	Charles Stanhope, 3rd Earl Stanhope, of England, designed and constructed a logical calculator which F. M. Beatty described as the first instrument to do with logical problems.
1786	J. H. Müller, an engineer in the Hessian army, first conceived of the idea of a difference engine (first written reference to the basic principles of a difference machine is dated to 1784).
1801	Joseph-Marie Jacquard developed the Jacquard loom, an automatic loom controlled by punched cards.
1820	Charles Xavier Thomas de Colmar invented the 'Arithmometer' which after thirty more years of development became, in 1851, the first mass-produced mechanical calculator. An operator could perform long multiplications and divisions quickly and effectively by using a movable accumulator for the result. This machine was based on the earlier works of Pascal and Leibniz.

== Invention of the mechanical computer ==
=== 1822-1851 ===
Date	Place	
1822	United Kingdom	Charles Babbage designed his first mechanical computer, the first prototype of the decimal difference engine for tabulating polynomials.
1831	Italy	Giovanni Plana designed a Perpetual Calendar machine, which can calculate the precise calendar for over 4000 years, accounting for leap years and variation in day length.
1832	Russia	Semen Korsakov proposed the usage of punched cards for information storage and search. He designed several machines to demonstrate his ideas, including the so-called linear homeoscope.
1832	United Kingdom	Babbage and Joseph Clement produced a prototype segment of his difference engine, which operated on 6-digit numbers and second-order differences (i.e., it could tabulate quadratic polynomials). The complete engine, which would have been room-sized, was planned to operate both on sixth-order differences with numbers of about 20 digits, and on third-order differences with numbers of 30 digits. Each addition would have been done in two phases, the second one taking care of any carries generated in the first. The output digits were to be punched into a soft metal plate, from which a printing plate might have been made. But there were various difficulties, and no more than this prototype piece was ever finished.
c. 1833	United Kingdom	Babbage conceived, and began to design, his decimal 'Analytical Engine'. A program for it was to be stored on read-only memory, in the form of punched cards. Babbage continued to work on the design for years, though after about 1840 design changes seem to have been minor. The machine would have operated on 40-digit numbers; the 'mill' (CPU) would have had 2 main accumulators and some auxiliary ones for specific purposes, while the 'store' (memory) would have held a thousand 50-digit numbers. There would have been several punched card readers, for both programs and data; the cards were to be chained and the motion of each chain reversible. The machine would have performed conditional jumps. There would also have been a form of microcoding: the meaning of instructions were to depend on the positioning of metal studs in a slotted barrel, called the "control barrel". The machine envisioned would have been capable of an addition in 3 seconds and a multiplication or division in 2–4 minutes. It was to be powered by a steam engine. In the end, no more than a few parts were actually built.
1835	United States	Joseph Henry invented the electromechanical relay.
1840	Italy	Charles Babbage's first public exposition about his Analytical Engine at Accademia delle Scienze, Turin.
1842	France	Timoleon Maurel patented the Arithmaurel, a mechanical calculator with a very intuitive user interface, especially for multiplying and dividing numbers because the result was displayed as soon as the operands were entered. It received a gold medal at the French national show in Paris in 1849. Unfortunately its complexity and the fragility of its design prevented it from being manufactured.
1842	United Kingdom	Construction of Babbage's difference engine was cancelled as an official project. The cost overruns had been considerable (£17,470 was spent, which, in 2025 money, would be about £1,677,000).
1843	Sweden	Per Georg Scheutz and his son Edvard produced a 5-digit numbers and third-order model of the difference engine with printer; the Swedish government agreed to fund their next development in 1851.
1846	United Kingdom	Babbage began to work on an improved difference engine (the Difference Engine No.2), producing a completely executed set of plans by 1849. The machine would have operated on 7th-order differences and 31-digit numbers, but nobody was found to pay to have it built. In 1989–1991 a team at London's Science Museum did build one from the surviving plans. They built components using modern methods, but with tolerances no better than Clement could have provided... and, after a bit of tinkering and detail-debugging, they found that the machine works properly. In 2000, the printer was also completed.
1847	United Kingdom	British Mathematician George Boole developed Boolean algebra which has been widely used in binary computer design and operation, beginning about a century later. See 1939.

=== 1851–1930 ===
Date	Place	Event
1851	France	After 30 years of development, Thomas de Colmar launched the mechanical calculator industry by starting the manufacturing of a much simplified Arithmometer (invented in 1820). Aside from its clones, which started thirty years later, it was the only calculating machine available anywhere in the world for forty years (Dorr E. Felt only sold one hundred comptometers and a few comptographs from 1887 to 1890). Its simplicity made it the most reliable calculator to date. It was a big machine (a 20 digit arithmometer was long enough to occupy most of a desktop). Even though the arithmometer was only manufactured until 1915, twenty European companies manufactured improved clones of its design until the beginning of WWII. Prominent clone manufacturers included Burkhardt, Layton, Saxonia, Gräber, Peerless, Mercedes-Euklid, XxX, and Archimedes.
1853	Sweden	Per Georg Scheutz and his son Edvard complete a full-scale difference engine, the first printing computer, largely inspired by the work of Babbage.
1856	United States	The first Tabulating Machine (see 1853) was bought by the Dudley Observatory in Albany, New York, and the second was ordered in 1857 by the British government. The Albany machine was used to produce a set of astronomical tables; but the Observatory's director was fired for this extravagant purchase, and the machine never seriously used again, eventually ending up in a museum. The second machine had a long and useful life.
c. 1859	Sweden	Martin Wiberg produced a reworked difference-engine-like machine intended to prepare interest rates (first publication in 1860) and logarithmic tables (first publication in 1875).
1871	United Kingdom	Babbage produced a prototype section of the Analytical Engine's mill and printer.
1877	United Kingdom	Jevons publishes his logical abacus, the first solely-digital (Boolean) mechanical computer. He noted influence from astronomical clocks, mechanical globes, planetariums, and slide rules.
1878	Spain	Ramón Verea, living in New York City, invented a calculator with an internal multiplication table; this was much faster than the shifting carriage, or other digital methods of the time. He wasn't interested in putting it into production, however; it seems he just wanted to show that a Spaniard could invent as well as an American.
1878	United Kingdom	A committee investigated the feasibility of completing the Analytical Engine, and concluded that it would be impossible now that Babbage was dead. The project was then largely forgotten, except by a very few; Howard Aiken was a notable exception.
1884	France	Philbert Maurice d'Ocagne publishes his first paper on nomography, though before he would later coin the term, which introduced the alignment nomogram.
1884	United States	Dorr Felt, of Chicago, developed his Comptometer. This was the first calculator in which operands are entered by pressing keys rather than having to be, for example, dialled in. It was feasible because of Felt's invention of a carry mechanism fast enough to act while the keys return from being pressed. Felt and Tarrant started a partnership to manufacture the comptometer in 1887.
1886	United States	First use of Herman Hollerith tabulating system in the Baltimore Department of Health.
1887	United States	Herman Hollerith filed a patent application for an integrating tabulator (granted in 1890), which could add numbers encoded on punched cards. First recorded use of this device was in 1889 in the Office of the Surgeon General of the Army. In 1896 Hollerith introduced improved model.
1890	United States; Sweden; Russia	A multiplying calculator more compact than the Arithmometer entered mass production. The design was the independent, and more or less simultaneous, invention of Frank S. Baldwin, of the United States, and Willgodt Theophil Odhner, a Swede living in Russia. Fluted drums were replaced by a "variable-toothed gear" design: a disk with radial pegs that could be made to protrude or retract from it.
1890	United States	The 1880 US census had taken 7 years to complete since all processing had been done by hand from journal sheets. The increasing population suggested that by the 1890 census, data processing would take longer than the 10 years before the next census—so a competition was held to find a better method. It was won by a Census Department employee, Herman Hollerith, who went on to found the Tabulating Machine Company, later to become IBM. He invented the recording of data on a medium that could then be read by a machine. Prior uses of machine readable media had been for control (Automatons, Piano rolls, looms, ...), not data. "After some initial trials with paper tape, he settled on punched cards..." His machines used mechanical relays to increment mechanical counters. This method was used in the 1890 census. The net effect of the many changes from the 1880 census: the larger population, the data items to be collected, the Census Bureau headcount, the scheduled publications, and the use of Hollerith's electromechanical tabulators, was to reduce the time required to process the census from eight years for the 1880 census to six years for the 1890 census. The inspiration for this invention was Hollerith's observation of railroad conductors during a trip in the Western United States; they encoded a crude description of the passenger (tall, bald, male) in the way they punched the ticket.
1891	United States	William S. Burroughs of St. Louis invented a machine similar to Felt's (see 1884) in 1885 but unlike the comptometer it was a 'key-set' machine which only processed each number after a crank handle was pulled. The true manufacturing of this machine started in 1891 even though Burroughs had started his American Arithmometer Company in 1886 (it later became Burroughs Corporation and is now called Unisys).
1899	Japan	Ryōichi Yazu began the development of a mechanical calculating machine (automatic abacus). Ryoichi independently conducted research on calculating machines, and it took three years to complete his biquinary mechanical desktop calculating machine, before applying for a patent in 1902. It was Japan's first successful mechanical computer.
c. 1900	United States	The Standard Adding Machine Company released the first 10-key adding machine in about 1900. The inventor, William Hopkins, filed his first patent on October 4, 1892. The 10 keys were set on a single row.
1902	United States	First model of Dalton adding machine is built. Remington advertised the Dalton adding machine as the first 10-key printing adding machine. The 10 keys were set on two rows. Six machines had been manufactured by the end of 1906.
1905	Japan	Ichitaro Kawaguchi, an engineer at the Ministry of Communications and Transportation, built the Kawaguchi Electric Tabulation Machine, used to tabulate some of the results of the 1904 Demographics Statistical Study.
1906	United Kingdom	Henry Babbage, Charles's son, with the help of the firm of R. W. Munro, completed the 'mill' from his father's Analytical Engine, to show that it would have worked. It does. The complete machine was not produced.
1906	United States	Audion (vacuum tube or thermionic valve) invented by Lee De Forest.
1906	United States	Herman Hollerith introduces a tabulator with a plugboard that can be rewired to adapt the machine for different applications. Plugboards were widely used to direct machine calculations until displaced by stored programs in the 1950s.
1909	Republic of Ireland	Following Babbage, although unaware of his earlier work, Percy Ludgate in 1909 published the 2nd of the only two designs for mechanical analytical engines in history.
1913	Spain	In his work Essays on Automatics (1913), Leonardo Torres y Quevedo formulates what will be a new branch of engineering: automation and designed a Babbage type of calculating machine that used electromechanical parts which introduced the idea of floating-point arithmetic.
1919	United Kingdom	William Henry Eccles and F. W. Jordan published the first flip-flop circuit design.
1924	Germany	Walther Bothe built an AND logic gate - the coincidence circuit, for use in physics experiments, for which he received the Nobel Prize in Physics 1954. Digital circuitries of all kinds make heavy use of this technique.
1928	United States	IBM standardizes on punched cards with 80 columns of data and rectangular holes. Widely known as IBM Cards, they dominate the data processing industry for almost half a century.
1929	United States	Westinghouse AC Calculating board. An AC network analyzer used for alternating current (AC) electrical transmission line simulations up until the 1960s.
c. 1930	United States	Vannevar Bush built a partly electronic differential analyzer capable of solving differential equations.
c. 1930	United Kingdom	Welsh physicist C. E. Wynn-Williams, at Cambridge, England, used a ring of thyratron tubes to construct a binary digital counter that counted emitted alpha particles.

=== 1931–1940 ===
Date	Place	Event
1931	Austria	Kurt Gödel of Vienna University, Austria, published a paper on a universal formal language based on arithmetic operations. He used it to encode arbitrary formal statements and proofs, and showed that formal systems such as traditional mathematics are either inconsistent in a certain sense, or contain unprovable but true statements. This result is often called the fundamental result of theoretical computer science.
1931	United States	IBM introduced the IBM 601 Multiplying Punch, an electromechanical machine that could read two numbers, up to 8 digits long, from a card and punch their product onto the same card.
1934	Japan, Soviet Union, United States	From 1934 to 1937, NEC engineer Akira Nakashima, Claude Shannon and Viktor Shestakov published a series of papers introducing switching circuit theory.
1934	United States	Wallace Eckert of Columbia University connects an IBM 285 Tabulator, an 016 Duplicating Punch and an IBM 601 Multiplying Punch with a cam-controlled sequencer switch that he designed. The combined system was used to automate the integration of differential equations.
1936	United Kingdom	Alan Turing of Cambridge University, England, published a paper on 'computable numbers' which reformulated Kurt Gödel's results (see related work by Alonzo Church). His paper addressed the famous 'Entscheidungsproblem' whose solution was sought in the paper by reasoning (as a mathematical device) about a simple and theoretical computer, known today as a Turing machine. In many ways, this device was more convenient than Gödel's arithmetics-based universal formal system.
1937	United States	George Stibitz of the Bell Telephone Laboratories (Bell Labs), New York City, constructed a demonstration 1-bit binary adder using relays. This was one of the first binary computers, although at this stage it was only a demonstration machine; improvements continued leading to the Complex Number Calculator of January 1940.
1937	United States	Claude E. Shannon published a paper on the implementation of symbolic logic using relays as his MIT Master's thesis.
1938	Germany	Konrad Zuse of Berlin, completed the 'Z1', the first mechanical binary programmable computer. It was based on Boolean Algebra and had some of the basic ingredients of modern machines, using the binary system and floating-point arithmetic. Zuse's 1936 patent application (Z23139/GMD Nr. 005/021) also suggested a 'von Neumann' architecture (re-invented about 1945) with program and data modifiable in storage. Originally the machine was called the 'V1' but retroactively renamed after the war, to avoid confusion with the V-1 flying bomb. It worked with floating-point numbers (7-bit exponent, 16-bit mantissa, and sign bit). The memory used sliding metal parts to store 16 such numbers, and worked well; but the arithmetic unit was less successful, occasionally suffering from certain mechanical engineering problems. The program was read from holes punched in discarded 35 mm movie film. Data values could have been entered from a numeric keyboard, and outputs were displayed on electric lamps. The machine was not a general purpose computer (i.e., Turing complete) because it lacked loop capabilities.
1939	United States	William Hewlett and David Packard established the Hewlett-Packard Company in Packard's garage in Palo Alto, California with an initial investment of $538 (equivalent to $12,305 in 2025); this was considered to be the symbolic founding of Silicon Valley. HP would grow to become one of the largest technology companies in the world today.
1939; Nov	United States	John Vincent Atanasoff and graduate student Clifford Berry of Iowa State College (now the Iowa State University), Ames, Iowa, completed a prototype 16-bit adder. This was the first machine to calculate using vacuum tubes.
1939 - 1940	Germany	Helmut Schreyer completed a prototype 10-bit adder using vacuum tubes, and a prototype memory using neon lamps.
1940	United States	At Bell Labs, Samuel Williams and George Stibitz completed a calculator which could operate on complex numbers, and named it the 'Complex Number Calculator'; it was later known as the 'Model I Relay Calculator'. It used telephone switching parts for logic: 450 relays and 10 crossbar switches. Numbers were represented in 'plus 3 BCD'; that is, for each decimal digit, 0 is represented by binary 0011, 1 by 0100, and so on up to 1100 for 9; this scheme requires fewer relays than straight BCD. Rather than requiring users to come to the machine to use it, the calculator was provided with three remote keyboards, at various places in the building, in the form of teletypes. Only one could be used at a time, and the output was automatically displayed on the same one. On 9 September 1940, a teletype was set up at a Dartmouth College in Hanover, New Hampshire, with a connection to New York, and those attending the conference could use the machine remotely.
1940	Germany	Konrad Zuse completed the 'Z2' (originally 'V2'), which combined the Z1's existing mechanical memory unit with a new arithmetic unit using relay logic. Like the Z1, the Z2 lacked loop capabilities. The project was interrupted for a year when Zuse was drafted in 1939, but continued after he was released. In 1940 Zuse presented the Z2 to an audience of the Deutsche Versuchsanstalt für Luftfahrt ("German Laboratory for Aviation") in Berlin-Adlershof.

== Invention of the programmable computer ==
=== 1941–1949 ===
Date	Place	Event
1941; May 11	Germany	Now working with limited backing from the DVL (German Aeronautical Research Institute), Konrad Zuse completed the 'Z3' (originally 'V3'): the first operational programmable computer. One major improvement over Charles Babbage's non-functional device is the use of Leibniz's binary system (Babbage and others unsuccessfully tried to build decimal programmable computers). Zuse's machine also featured floating-point numbers with a 7-bit exponent, 14-bit mantissa (with a '1' bit automatically prefixed unless the number is 0), and a sign bit. The memory held 64 of these words and therefore required over 1400 relays; there were 1200 more in the arithmetic and control units. It also featured parallel adders. The program, input, and output were implemented as described above for the Z1. Although conditional jumps were not available, it has been shown that Zuse's Z3 is, in principle, capable of functioning as a universal computer. The machine could do 3–4 additions per second, and took 3–5 seconds for a multiplication. The Z3 was destroyed in 1943 during an Allied bombardment of Berlin, and had no impact on computer technology in America and England.
1942; Summer	United States	Atanasoff and Berry completed a special-purpose calculator for solving systems of simultaneous linear equations, later called the 'ABC' ('Atanasoff–Berry Computer'). This had 60 50-bit words of memory in the form of capacitors (with refresh circuits—the first regenerative memory) mounted on two revolving drums. The clock speed was 60 Hz, and an addition took 1 second. For secondary memory it used punched cards, moved around by the user. The holes were not actually punched in the cards, but burned. The punched card system's error rate was never reduced beyond 0.001%, and this was inadequate. Atanasoff left Iowa State after the U.S. entered the war, ending his work on digital computing machines.
1942	Germany	Helmut Hölzer built an analog computer to calculate and simulate V-2 rocket trajectories.
1942	Germany	Konrad Zuse developed the S1, the world's first process computer, used by Henschel to measure the surface of wings.
1943; Apr	United Kingdom	Max Newman, C. E. Wynn-Williams and their team at the secret Government Code and Cypher School ('Station X'), Bletchley Park, Bletchley, England, completed the 'Heath Robinson'. This was a specialized counting machine used for cipher-breaking, not a general-purpose calculator or computer, but a logic device using a combination of electronics and relay logic. It read data optically at 2000 characters per second from two closed loops of paper tape. It was significant as it was the forerunner of Colossus. Newman knew Turing from Cambridge University (Turing was a student of Newman's), and had been the first person to see a draft of Turing's 1936 paper. Heath Robinson is the name of a British cartoonist known for drawings of comical machines, like the American Rube Goldberg. Two later machines in the series were named after London stores with 'Robinson' in their names.
1943; Sep	United States	Williams and Stibitz completed the 'Relay Interpolator', later called the 'Model II Relay Calculator'. This was a programmable calculator; again, the program and data were read from paper tapes. An innovative feature was that, for greater reliability (error-detecting/self-checking), numbers were represented in a biquinary format using seven relays for each digit, of which exactly two should be "on": 01 00001 for 0, 01 00010 for 1, and so on up to 10 10000 for 9. Some of the later machines in this series would use the biquinary notation for the digits of floating-point numbers.
1943; Dec	United Kingdom	The Mark 1 Colossus was completed, by Tommy Flowers at The Post Office Research Laboratories in London, to assist in the cracking of the German Lorenz SZ42 cipher at Bletchley Park. It was a binary digital machine that contained 1500 vacuum tubes (valves), and applied a programmable logical function to a stream of characters, read and re-read from a loop of punched paper tape at a rate of 5000 characters a second. It had 501 bits of memory, the program being set on switches and plug panels. Colossus was used at Bletchley Park during World War II—as a follow on from the less productive Heath Robinson machines.
1944; June	United Kingdom	The first Mark 2 Colossus was commissioned. It was a development of the Mark 1 machine and contained 2400 vacuum tubes. It had five identical parallel processors fed from a shift register that enabled processing of 25,000 characters a second. Colossus could evaluate a wide range of Boolean algebraic functions for helping to establish the rotor settings of the Lorenz SZ42 machine. Ten Mark 2 Colossi were in use at Bletchley Park by the end of the war in Europe in May 1945. All but two of the machines were then dismantled into such small parts that it was not possible to infer their use, so as to maintain the secrecy of the work. The remaining two were dismantled at GCHQ Cheltenham in the 1960s.
1944; August 7	United States	The IBM Automatic Sequence Controlled Calculator was turned over to Harvard University, which called it the Harvard Mark I. It was designed by Howard Aiken and his team, financed and built by IBM—it became the second program-controlled machine (after Konrad Zuse's). The whole machine was 51 feet (16 m) long, weighed 5 (short) tons (4.5 tonnes), and incorporated 750,000 parts. It used 3304 electromechanical relays as on-off switches, had 72 accumulators (each with its own arithmetic unit), as well as a mechanical register with a capacity of 23 digits plus sign. The arithmetic was fixed-point and decimal, with a control panel setting determining the number of decimal places. Input–output facilities include card readers, a card punch, paper tape readers, and typewriters. There were 60 sets of rotary switches, each of which could be used as a constant register—sort of mechanical read-only memory. The program was read from one paper tape; data could be read from the other tapes, or the card readers, or from the constant registers. Conditional jumps were not available. However, in later years, the machine was modified to support multiple paper tape readers for the program, with the transfer from one to another being conditional, rather like a conditional subroutine call. Another addition allowed the provision of plug-board wired subroutines callable from the tape. Used to create ballistics tables for the US Navy.
1945	Germany	Konrad Zuse developed Plankalkül, the first higher-level programming language. He also presented the Z4 in March.
1945	United States	Vannevar Bush developed the theory of the memex, a hypertext device linked to a library of books and films.
1945	United States	John von Neumann drafted a report describing the future computer eventually built as the EDVAC (Electronic Discrete Variable Automatic Computer). First Draft of a Report on the EDVAC includes the first published description of the design of a stored-program computer, giving rise to the term von Neumann architecture. It directly or indirectly influenced nearly all subsequent projects, especially EDSAC. The design team included John W. Mauchly and J. Presper Eckert.
1946; February 14	United States	ENIAC (Electronic Numerical Integrator and Computer): One of the first totally electronic, vacuum tube, digital, program-controlled computers was unveiled although it was shut down on 9 November 1946 for a refurbishment and a memory upgrade, and was transferred to Aberdeen Proving Ground, Maryland in 1947. Development had started in 1943 at the Ballistic Research Laboratory, USA, by John W. Mauchly and J. Presper Eckert. It weighed 30 tonnes and contained 18,000 vacuum tubes, consuming around 160 kW of electrical power. It could do 5,000 basic calculations a second. It was used for calculating ballistic trajectories and testing theories behind the hydrogen bomb.
1946; February 19	United Kingdom	ACE (Automatic Computing Engine): Alan Turing presented a detailed paper to the National Physical Laboratory (NPL) Executive Committee, giving the first reasonably complete design of a stored-program computer. However, because of the strict and long-lasting secrecy around his wartime work at Bletchley Park, he was prohibited (having signed the Official Secrets Act) from explaining that he knew that his ideas could be implemented in an electronic device.
1946	United Kingdom	The trackball was invented as part of a radar plotting system named Comprehensive Display System (CDS) by Ralph Benjamin when working for the British Royal Navy Scientific Service. Benjamin's project used analog computers to calculate the future position of target aircraft based on several initial input points provided by a user with a joystick. Benjamin felt that a more elegant input device was needed and invented a ball tracker system called the roller ball for this purpose in 1946. The device was patented in 1947, but only a prototype was ever built and the device was kept as a secret outside military.
1947; January 7–10	United States	Navy's Bureau of Ordnance and Harvard University jointly sponsored a symposium at the Harvard Computation Laboratory on Large-Scale Digital Calculating Machinery
1947; September	United Kingdom	Development of the first assembly language by Kathleen Booth at Birkbeck, University of London following work with John von Neumann and Herman Goldstine at the Institute for Advanced Study.
1947; December 16	United States	Invention of the transistor at Bell Laboratories, USA, by William B. Shockley, John Bardeen and Walter Brattain.
1947	United States	Howard Aiken completed the Harvard Mark II.
1947	United States	The Association for Computing Machinery (ACM), was founded as the world's first scientific and educational computing society. It remains to this day with a membership currently around 78,000. Its headquarters are in New York City.
1948; January 27	United States	IBM finished the SSEC (Selective Sequence Electronic Calculator). It was the first computer to modify a stored program. "About 1300 vacuum tubes were used to construct the arithmetic unit and eight very high-speed registers, while 23000 relays were used in the control structure and 150 registers of slower memory."
1948; May 12	United Kingdom	The Birkbeck ARC, the first of three machines developed at Birkbeck, University of London by Andrew Booth and Kathleen Booth, officially came online on this date. The control was entirely electromechanical and the memory was based on a rotating magnetic drum. This was the first rotating drum storage device in existence.
1948; June 21	United Kingdom	The Manchester Baby was built at the University of Manchester. It ran its first program on this date. It was the first computer to store both its programs and data in RAM, as modern computers do. By 1949 the 'Baby' had grown, and acquired a magnetic drum for more permanent storage, and it became the Manchester Mark 1.
1948	United States	ANACOM from Westinghouse was an AC-energized electrical analog computer system used up until the early 1990s for problems in mechanical and structural design, fluidics, and various transient problems.
1948	United States	IBM introduced the '604', the first machine to feature Field Replaceable Units (FRUs), which cut downtime as entire pluggable units can simply be replaced instead of troubleshot.
1948		The first Curta handheld mechanical calculator was sold. The Curta computed with 11 digits of decimal precision on input operands up to 8 decimal digits. The Curta was about the size of a handheld pepper grinder.
1949; Mar	United States	John Presper Eckert and John William Mauchly construct the BINAC for Northrop.
1949; May 6	United Kingdom	Maurice Wilkes and a team at Cambridge University executed the first stored program on the EDSAC computer, which used paper tape input–output. Based on ideas from John von Neumann about stored program computers, the EDSAC was the first complete, fully functional von Neumann architecture computer.
1949; Oct	United Kingdom	The Manchester Mark 1 final specification is completed; this machine was notably in being the first computer to use the equivalent of base/index registers, a feature not entering common computer architecture until the second generation around 1955.
1949	Australia	CSIR Mk I (later known as CSIRAC), Australia's first computer, ran its first test program. It was a vacuum-tube-based electronic general-purpose computer. Its main memory stored data as a series of acoustic pulses in 5 ft (1.5 m) long tubes filled with mercury.
1949	United Kingdom	MONIAC (Monetary National Income Analogue Computer) also known as the Phillips Hydraulic Computer, was created in 1949 to model the national economic processes of the United Kingdom. The MONIAC consisted of a series of transparent plastic tanks and pipes. It is thought that twelve to fourteen machines were built.

== Gallery ==
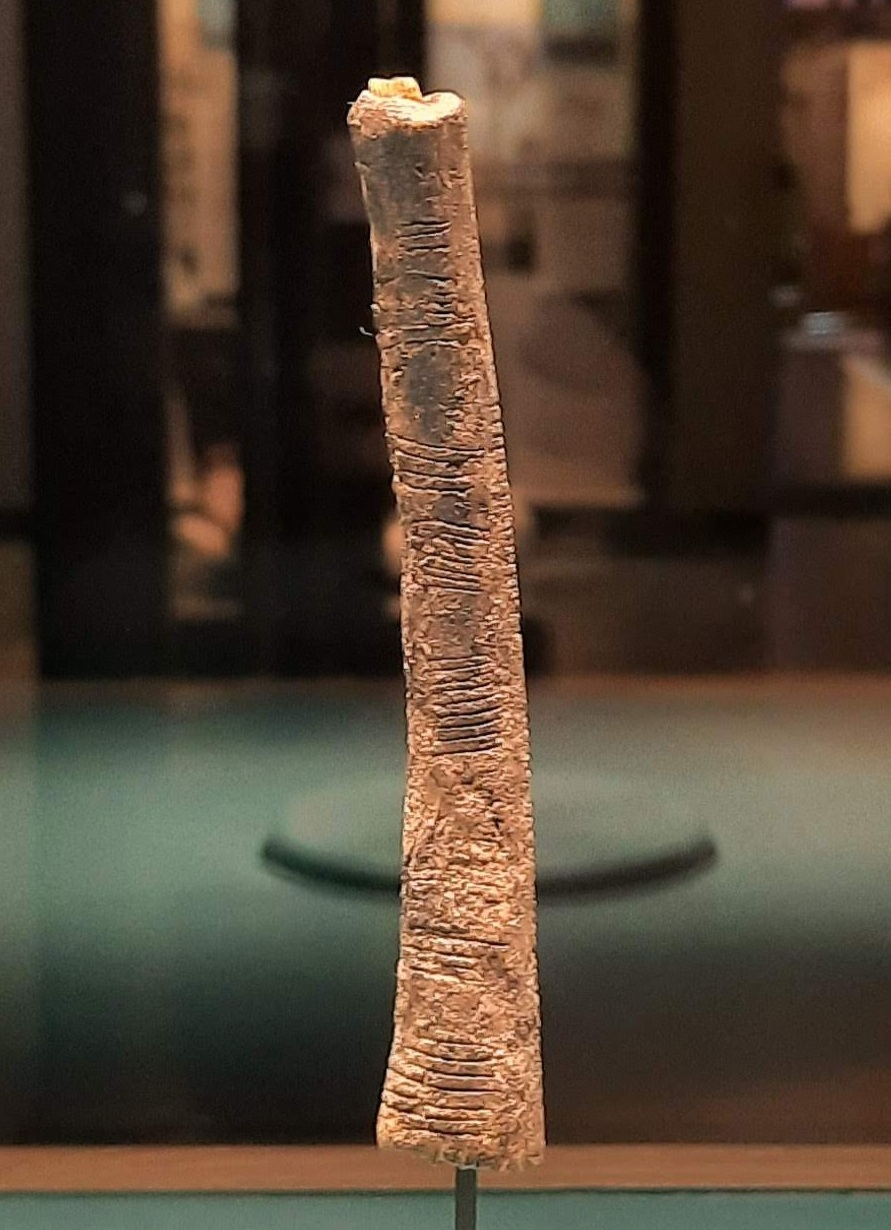
The Ishango bone.

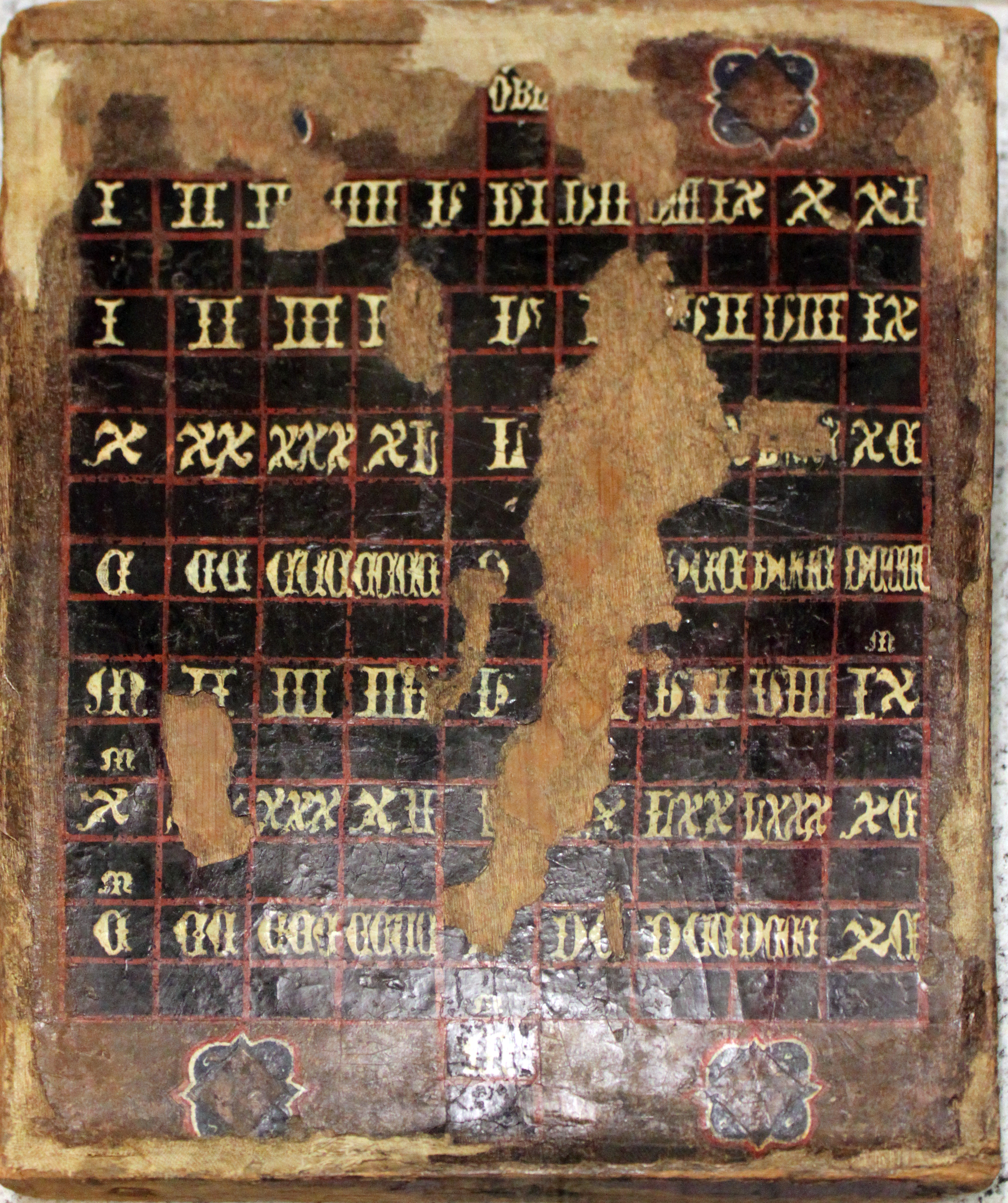
A medieval abacus from c. 1340.

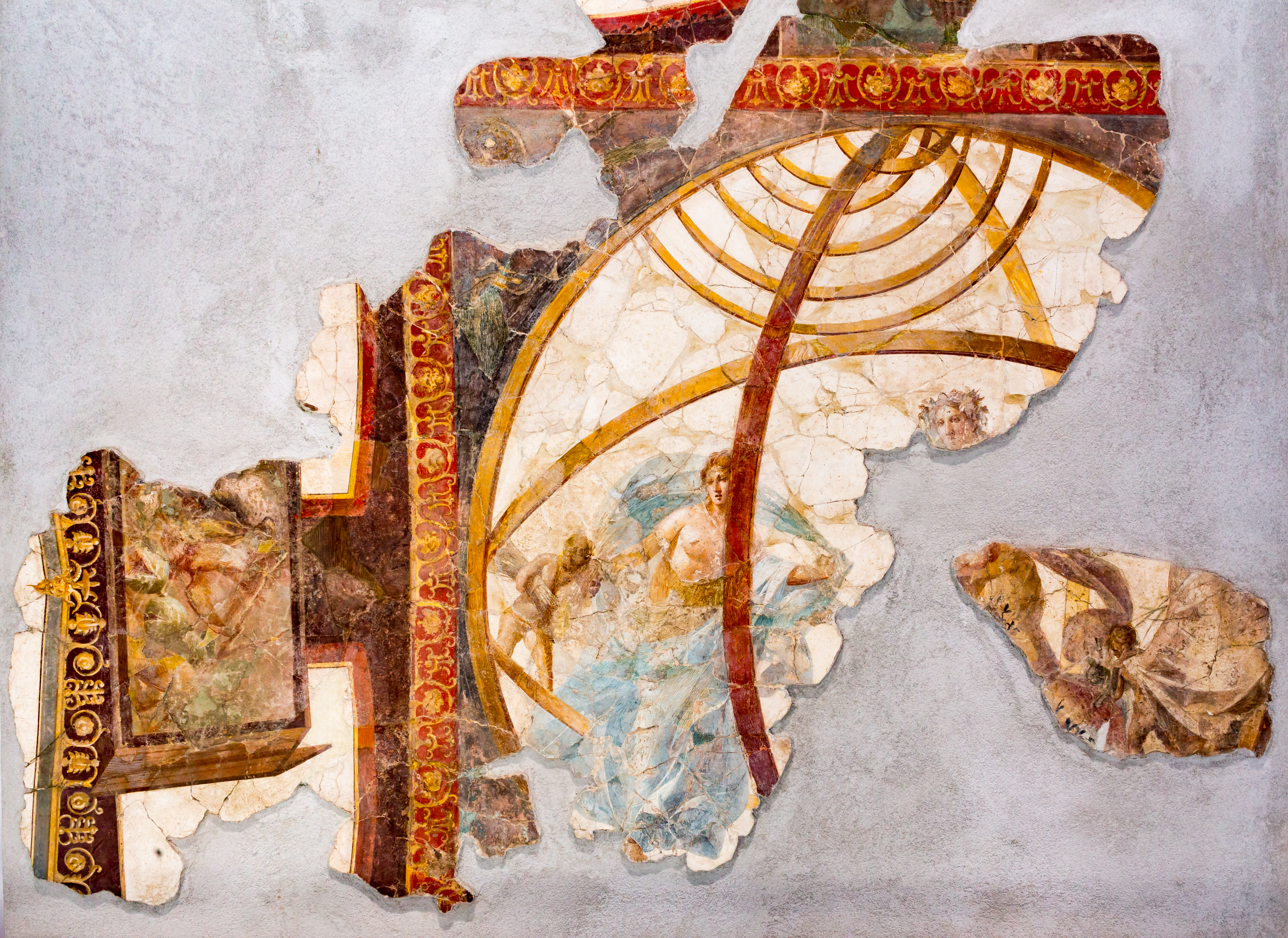
Wall painting of an armillary sphere from the 1st century.

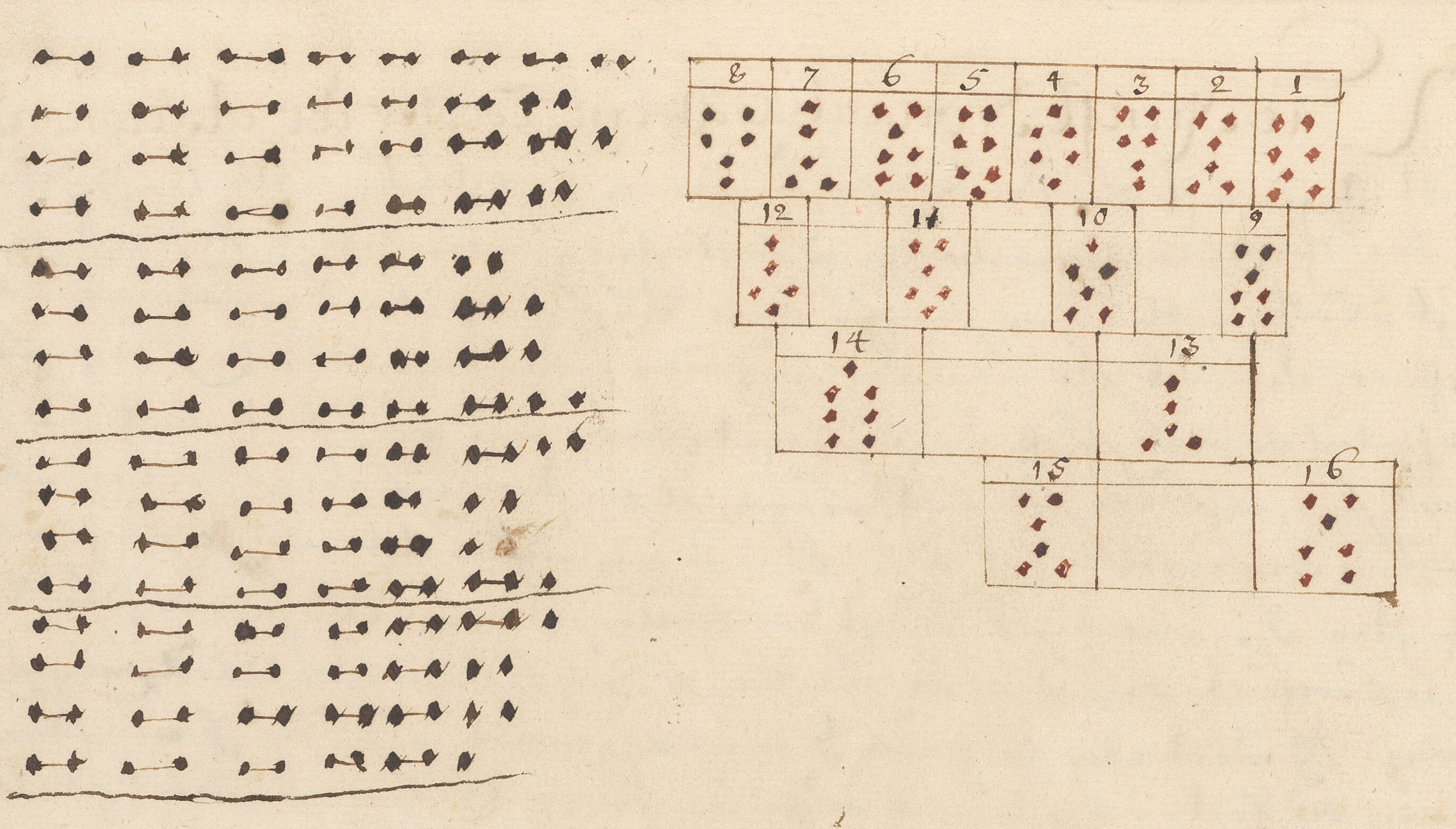
Process of geomantic punctuation and generation of a shield diagram.

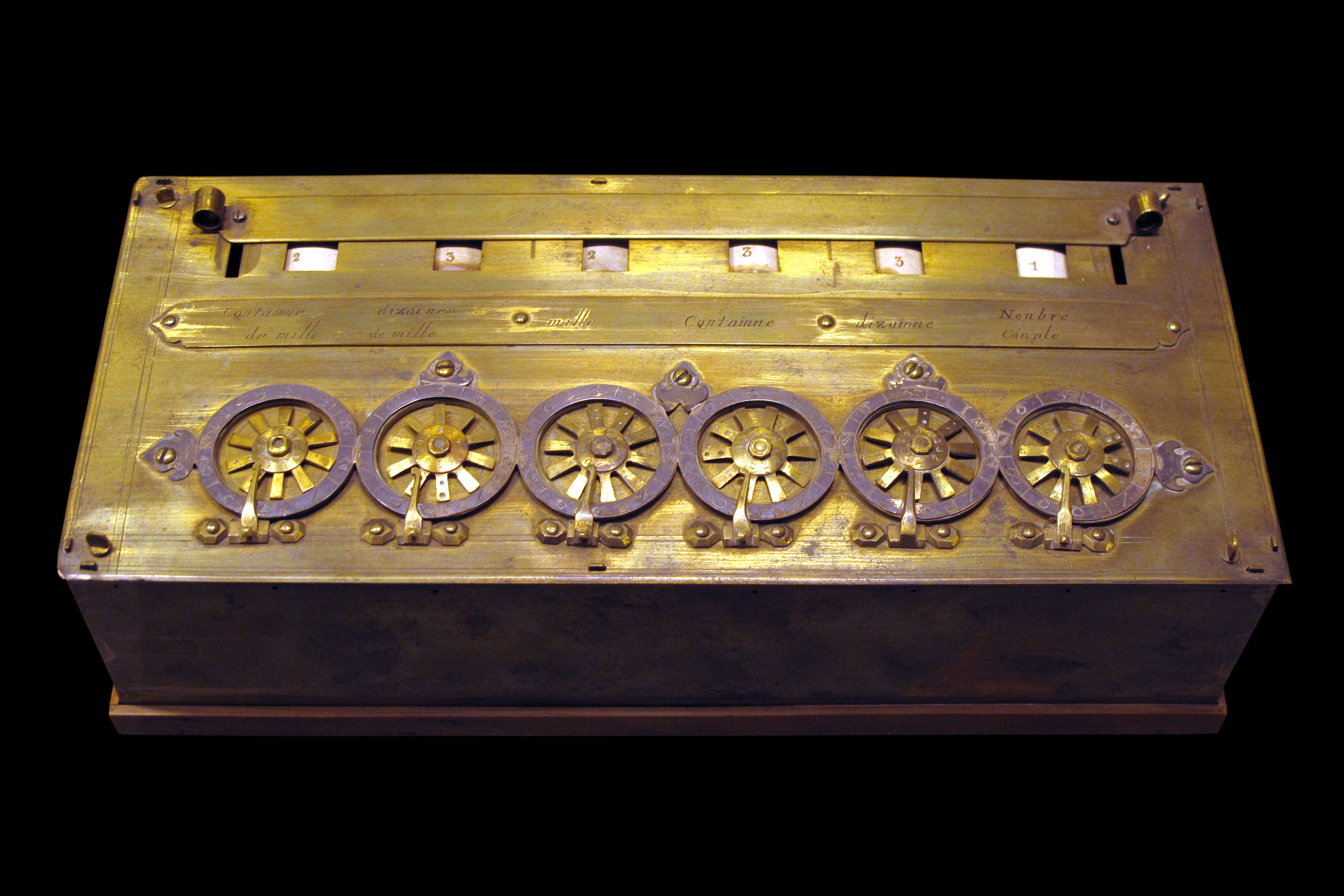
Pascaline.

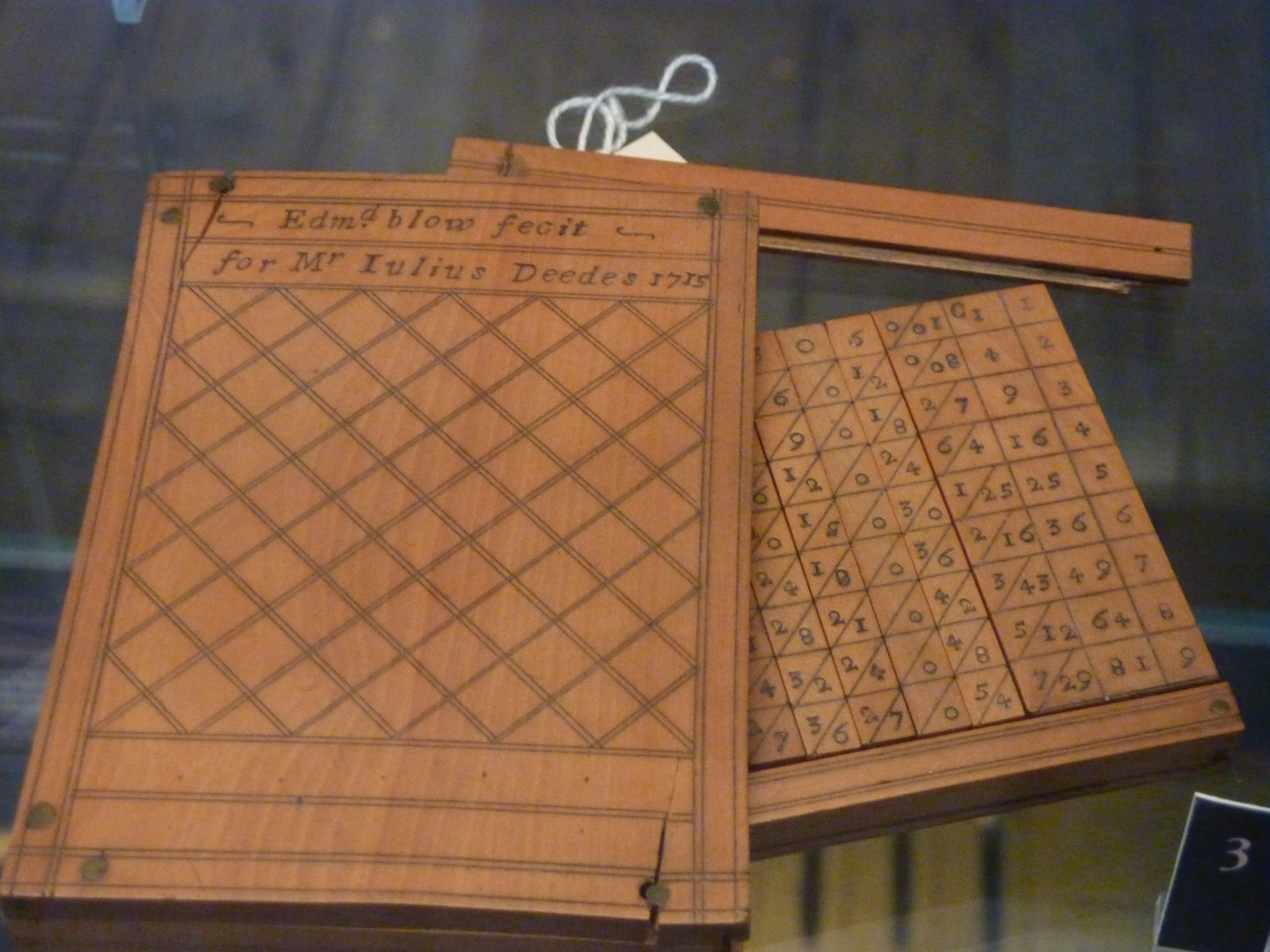
Napier's bones

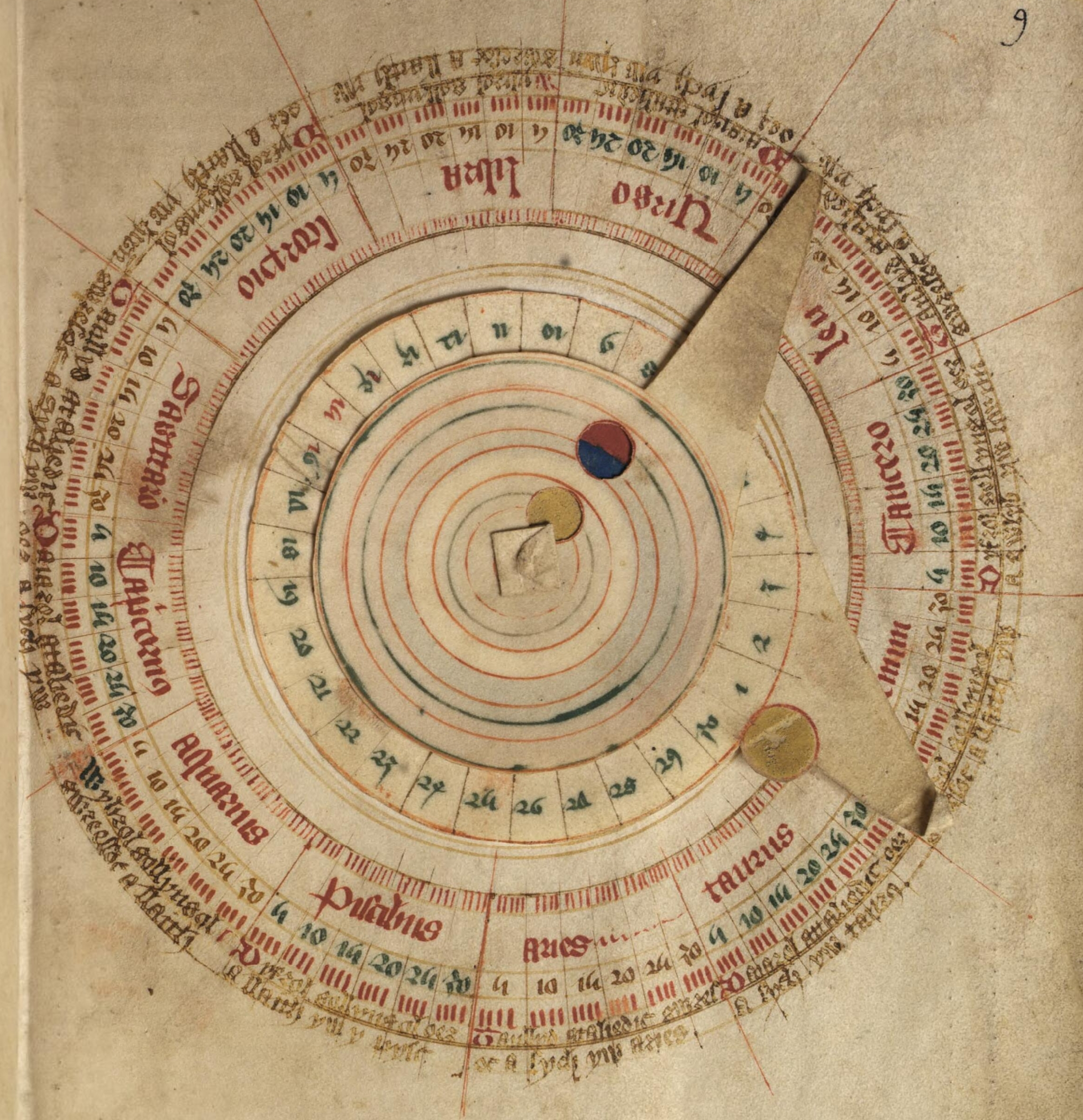
Volvelle.

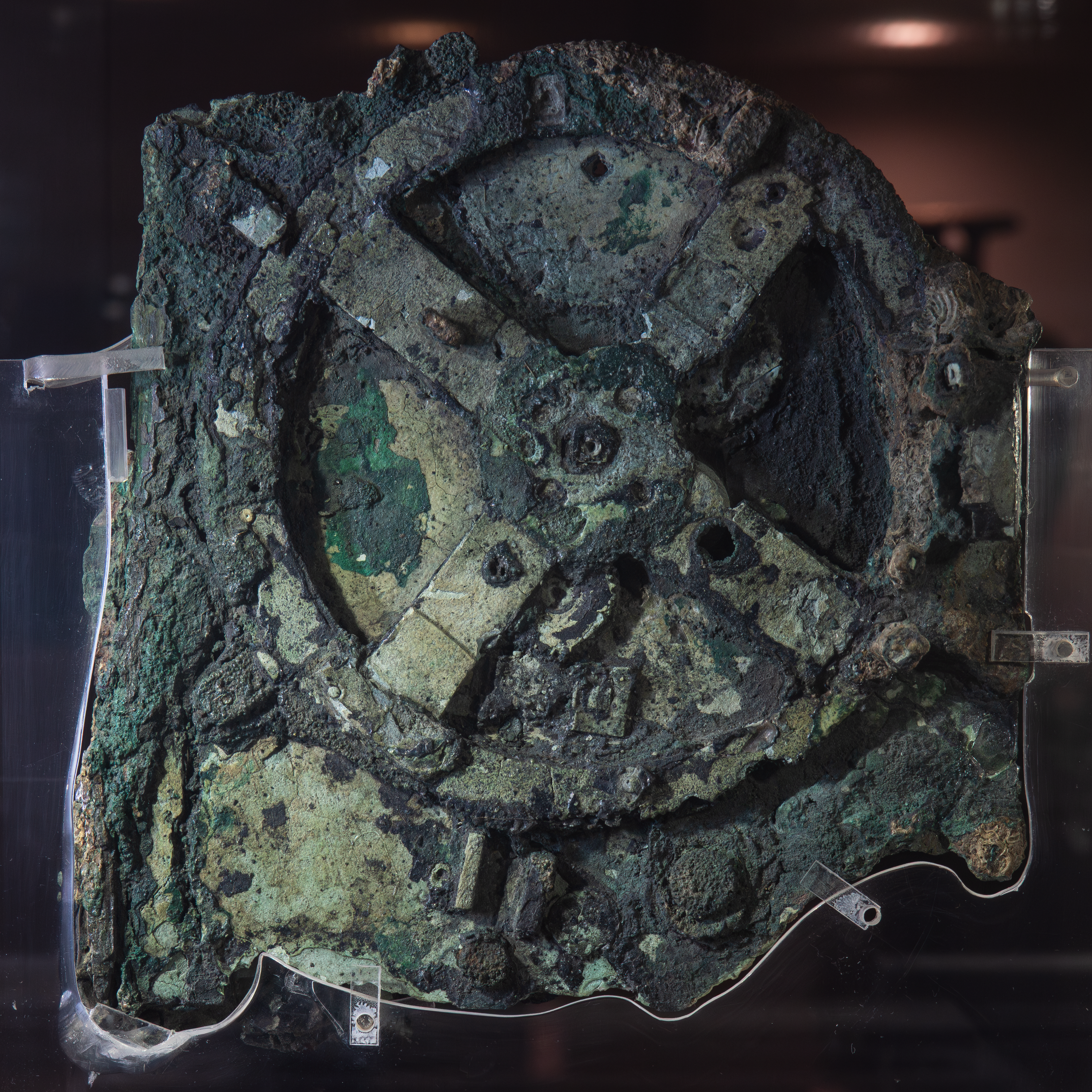
Fragment A of the Antikythera Mechanism.

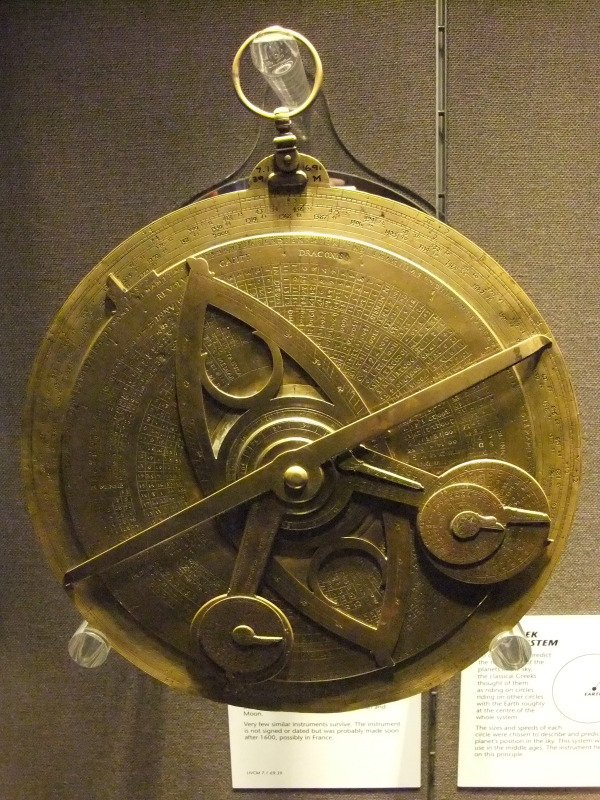
Equatorium.

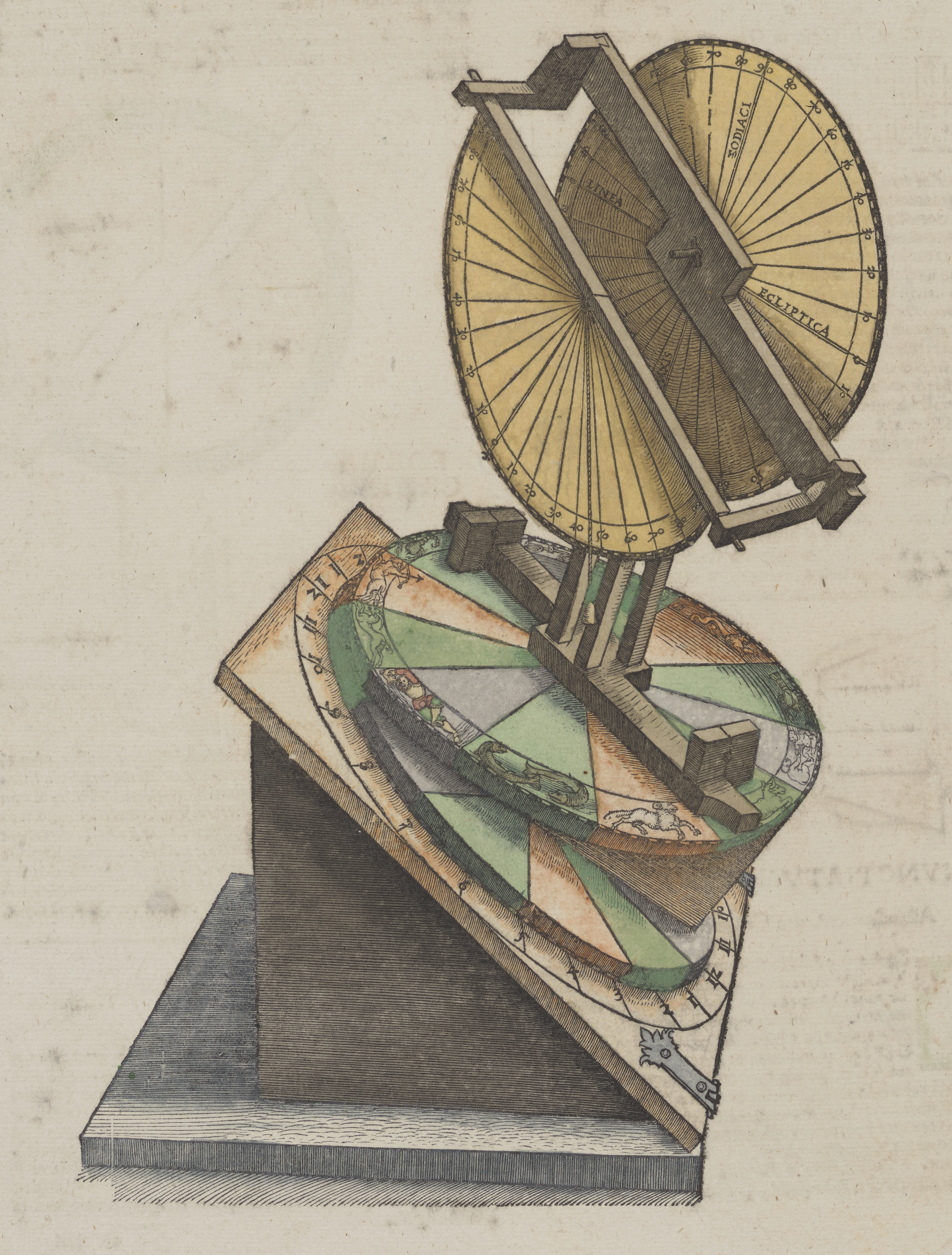
Torquetum.

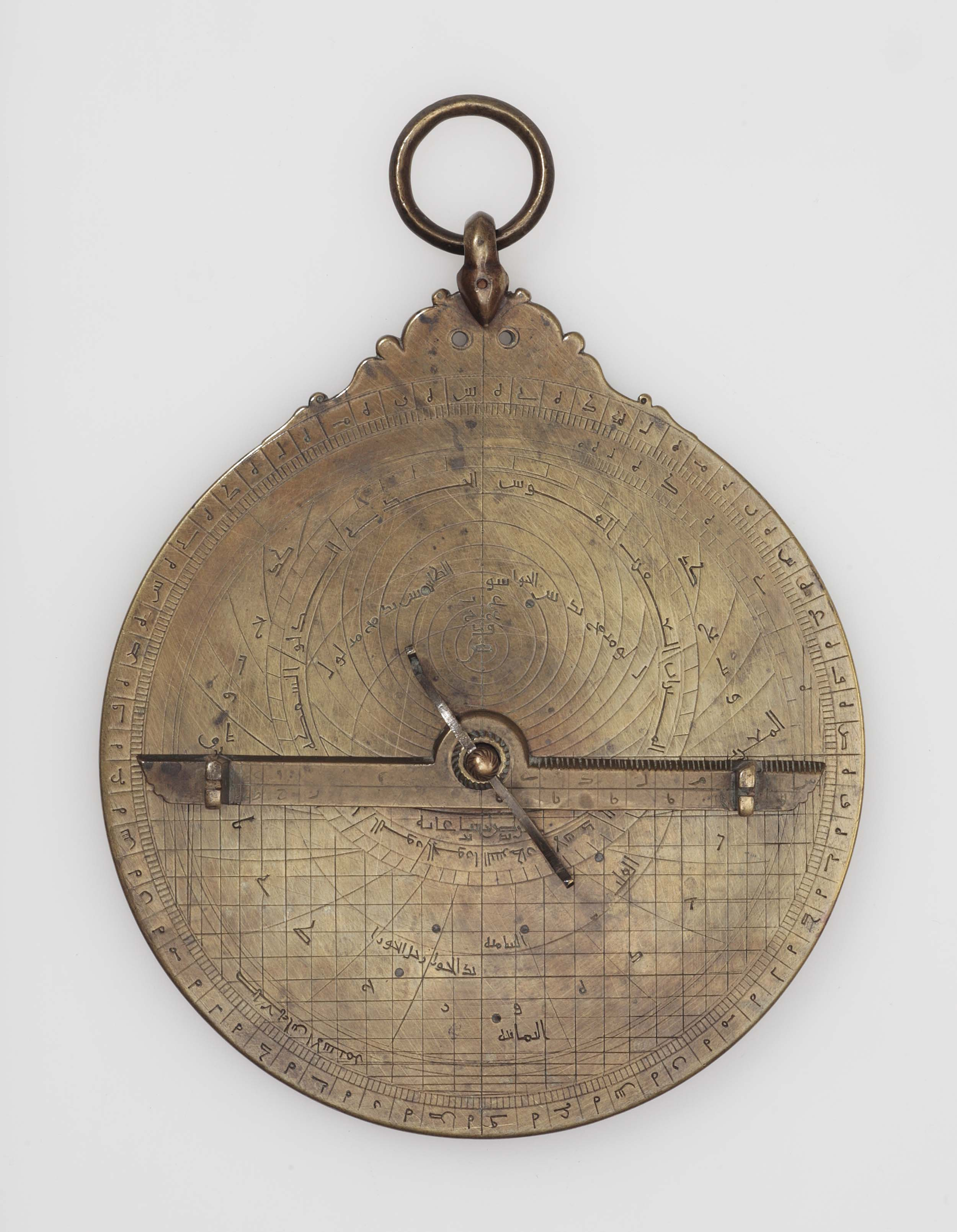
Planispheric astrolabe in the Khalili Collection.

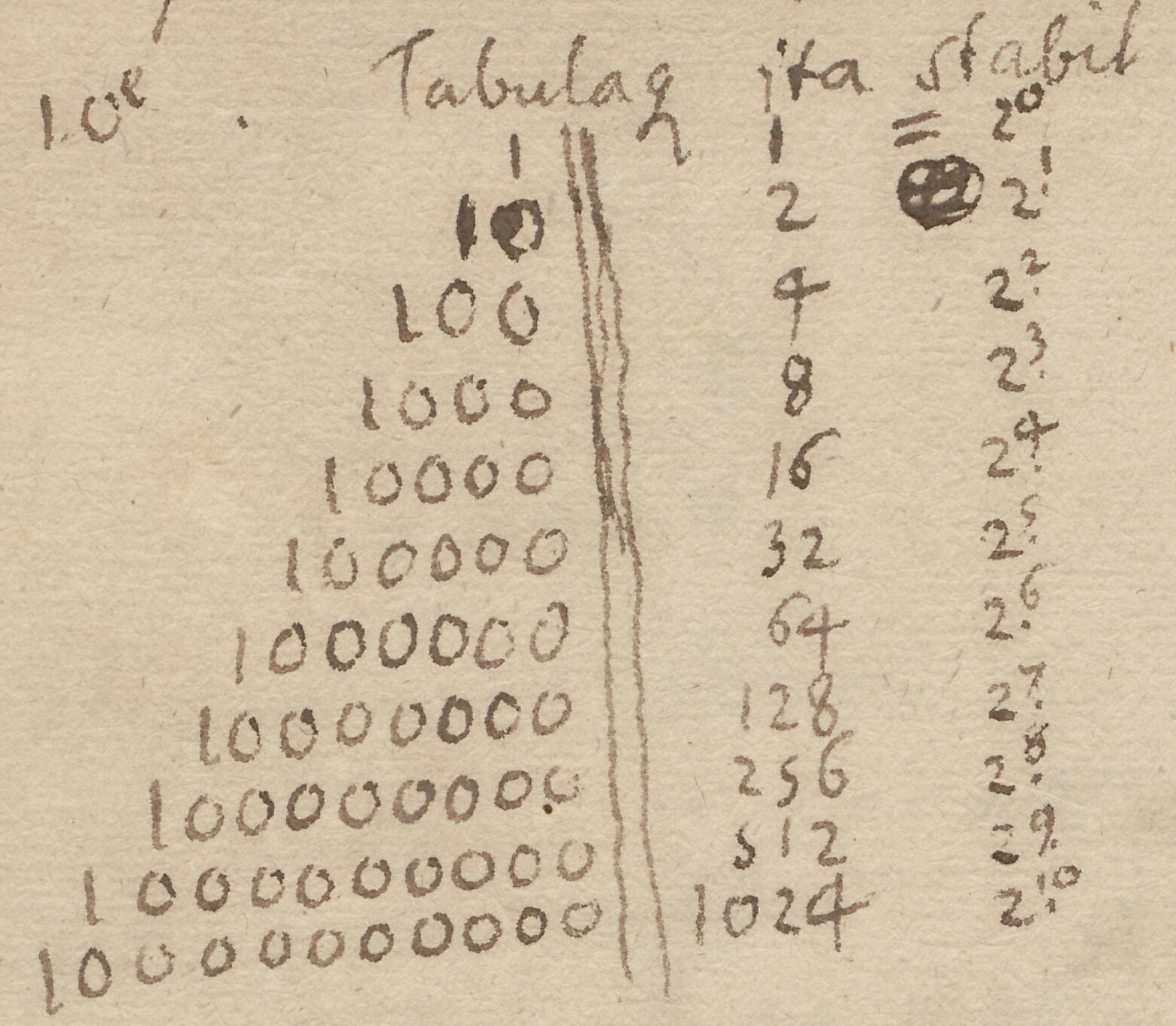
Leibniz on binary.

Stanhope demonstrator.

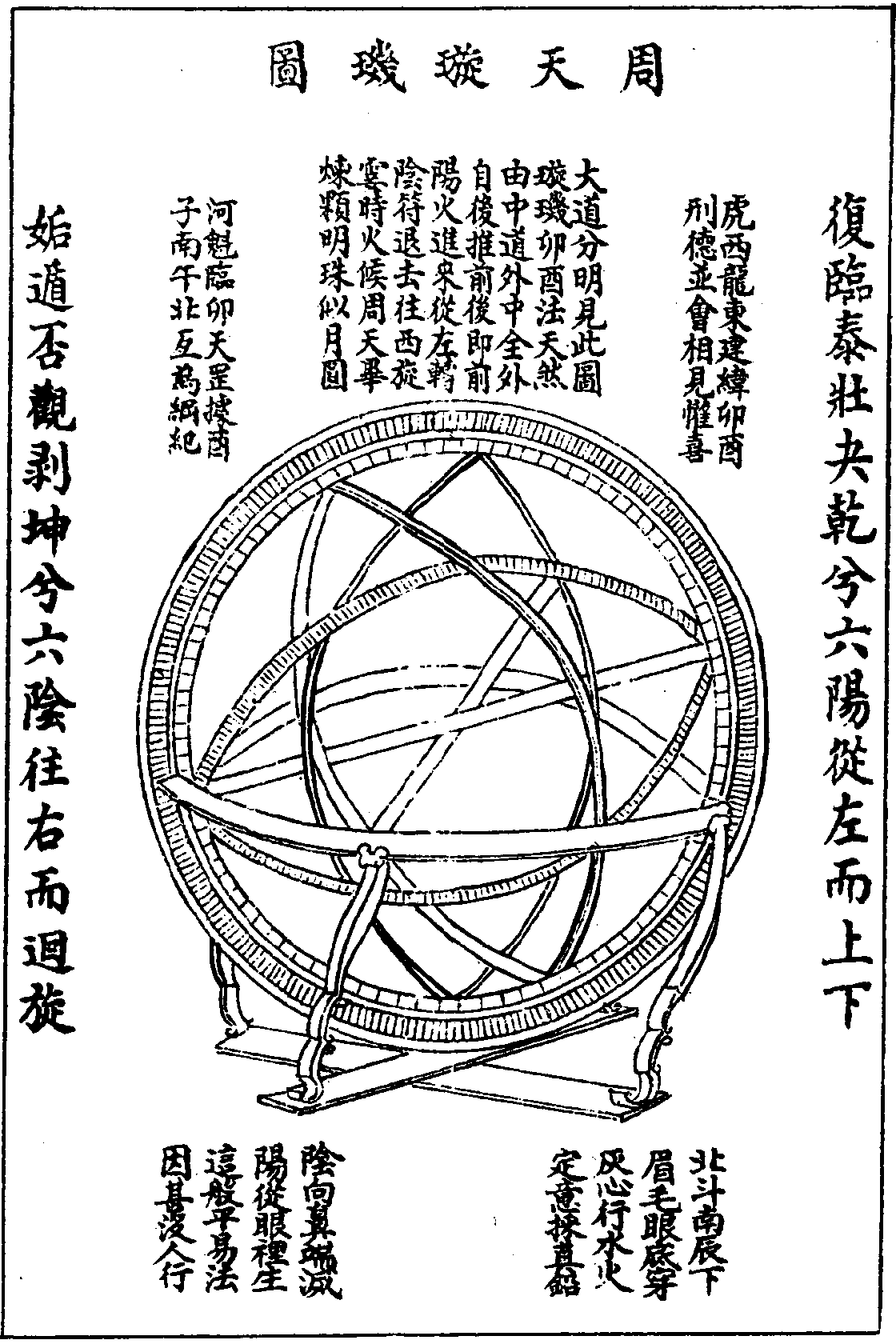
Armillary sphere.

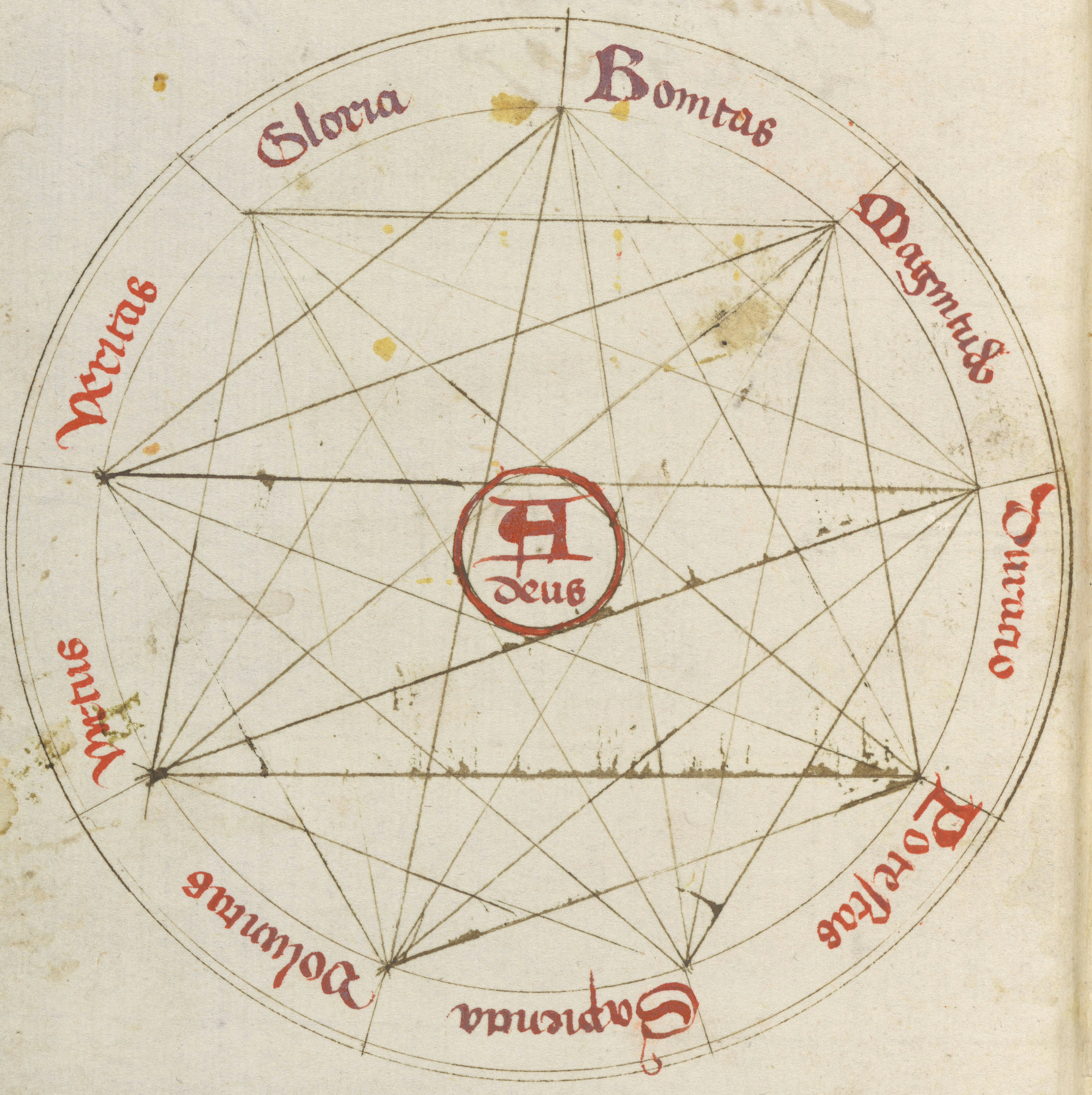
Figure A of Ramon Llull's Art, showing its first principles (the dignities) shared between Judaism, Islam, and Christianity. From a 15th century German manuscript housed at the Wellcome Collection.

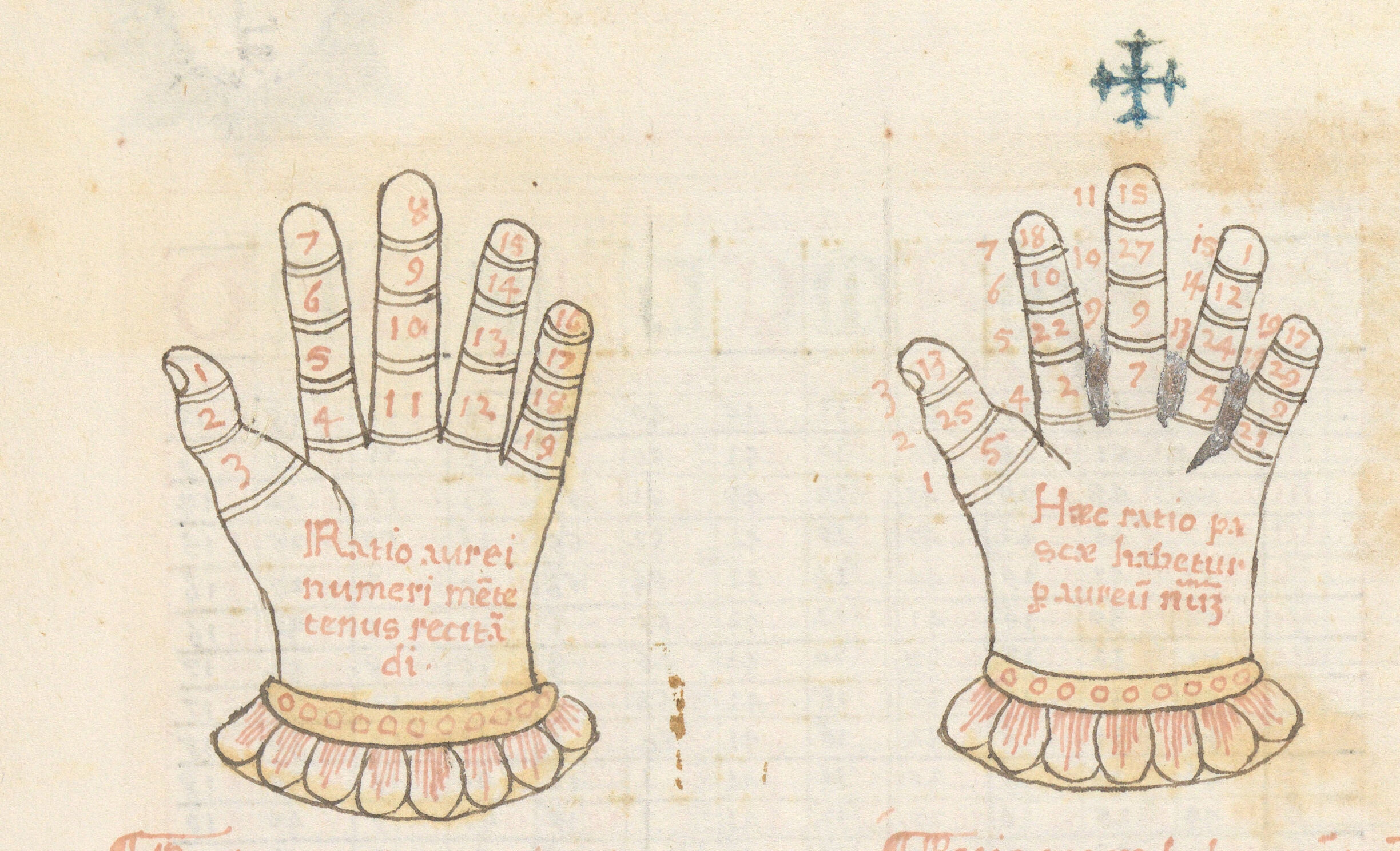
Finger reckoning from a 15th century manuscript.

== Computing timeline ==
- Timeline of computing
  - 1950–1979
  - 1980–1989
  - 1990–1999
  - 2000–2009
  - 2010–2019
  - 2020–present
- History of computing hardware

== Sources ==
- Bonner, Anthony (2007). The Art and Logic of Ramon Llull: A User's Guide. Leiden: Brill. ISBN 978-90-04-16325-6.
- Borst, Arno (1993). The Ordering of Time: From the Ancient Computus to the Modern Computer. Chicago: The University of Chicago Press. ISBN 0-226-06658-4.
- Hopp, Peter M. (1999). Slide Rules: Their History, Models, and Makers. Globe Pequot. ISBN 9781493054435.
- Ifrah, Georges; Ifrah, Georges (2001). The universal history of computing: from the abacus to the quantum computer. New York Weinheim: Wiley. ISBN 978-0-471-44147-2.
- Igarashi, Toshihide; Altman, Tom; Funada, Mariko; Kamiyama, Barbara (2014). Computing A Historical and Technical Perspective. Routledge. ISBN 9781482227413.
- Llull, Ramon (1994). Bonner, Anthony (ed.). Doctor Illuminatus: A Ramon Llull Reader. Princeton University Press. ISBN 9780691000916.
- Lewis, M. J. T. (2001), Surveying Instruments of Greece and Rome, Cambridge University Press, ISBN 978-0-511-48303-5
- Marguin, Jean (1994). Histoire des instruments et machines à calculer, trois siècles de mécanique pensante 1642–1942 (in French). Hermann. ISBN 978-2-7056-6166-3.
- Needham, Joseph; Wang, Ling (1995) [1959]. Science and Civilisation in China: Volume 3, Mathematics and the Sciences of the Heavens and the Earth. Cambridge, England: Cambridge University Press. ISBN 978-0-521-05801-8.
- Ginsburg, Jekuthiel (2003). Scripta Mathematica (Septembre 1932-Juin 1933). Kessinger Publishing, LLC. ISBN 978-0-7661-3835-3.
- Gladstone-Millar, Lynne (2003). John Napier: Logarithm John. National Museums Of Scotland. ISBN 978-1-901663-70-9.
- Taton, René (1969). Histoire du calcul. Que sais-je ? n° 198. Presses universitaires de France.
- Swedin, Eric G.; Ferro, David L. (2005). Computers: The Life Story of a Technology. Greenwood. ISBN 978-0-313-33149-7.
- Taton, René (1963). Le calcul mécanique (in French). Paris: Presses universitaires de France.
- Smith, David Eugene (1929). A Source Book in Mathematics. New York and London: McGraw-Hill Book Company, Inc.
- Williams, Michael R. (1997). A history of computing technology. Los Alamitos: IEEE Computer Society. ISBN 0-8186-7739-2.
