= Certified wireless security professional =

Certification

The Certified Wireless Security Professional (CWSP) is an advanced level certification that measures the ability to secure any wireless network.

A wide range of security topics focusing on the 802.11 wireless LAN technology are covered in the coursework and exam, which is vendor neutral.

== Certification track ==
The CWSP certification is awarded to candidates who pass the CWSP exam and who also hold the CWNA certification. The CWNA certification is a prerequisite to earning the CWSP certification.

== CWSP requirements ==
This certification covers a wide range of security areas. These include detecting attacks, wireless analysis, policy, monitoring and solutions.

== Recertification ==
The CWSP certification is valid for three years. The certification may be renewed by retaking the CWSP exam or by advancing on to CWNE which is also valid for 3 years.

== See also ==
- Professional certification (Computer technology)
