= Timeline of computing =

Timeline of computing presents events in the history of computing organized by year and grouped into six topic areas: predictions and concepts, first use and inventions, hardware systems and processors, operating systems, programming languages, and new application areas.

Detailed computing timelines: before 1950, 1950–1979, 1980–1989, 1990–1999, 2000–2009, 2010–2019, 2020–present

== See also ==
- History of compiler construction
- History of computing hardware – up to third generation (1960s)
- History of computing hardware (1960s–present) – third generation and later
- History of the graphical user interface
- History of the Internet
- History of the World Wide Web
- List of pioneers in computer science
- Timeline of electrical and electronic engineering
- Microprocessor chronology

== Resources ==
- Steven Black, A Brief History of Computing
- The Computer History in time and space, Graphing Project, an attempt to build a graphical image of computer history, in particular operating systems.
- The Computer Revolution/Timeline at Wikibooks
- "File:Timeline.pdf - Engineering and Technology History Wiki" (PDF). ethw.org. 2012. Archived (PDF) from the original on 2017-10-31.
