= Certified wireless network expert =

Highest level certification in the CWNP program

The Certified Wireless Network Expert (CWNE) is the highest level certification in the CWNP program started in 2001 by Planet3 Wireless. It certifies the ability to design, install, secure, optimize and troubleshoot IEEE 802.11 wireless networks.

== Certification track ==
The CWNE credential is the final step in a four-level certification process. It validates the applicant's real-world application of the principles covered by the other CWNP certification exams, including wireless protocol analysis, security, advanced design, spectrum analysis, wired network administration, and troubleshooting.

== CWNE Requirements ==
The requirements for earning the CWNE certification changed on October 1, 2010, when the CWNE exam (PW0-300) was retired. The new requirements for the CWNE certification are:

- Valid and current CWSP, CWAP, CWISA, and CWDP certifications (requires CWNA).
- Three (3) years of documented enterprise Wi-Fi implementation experience.
- Three (3) professional endorsements.
- One (1) other current, valid professional networking certifications.
- Documentation of three (3) enterprise Wi-Fi projects in which you participated or led in the form of 500 word essays.

== Recertification ==
Like most other CWNP certifications, the CWNE certification is valid for three (3) years. The certification may be renewed by reporting at least sixty (60) hours of approved Continuing Education (CE).

Passing the most current version of either the CWSP, CWAP, or CWDP exam, which was the only recertification requirement prior to the change, is now worth twenty (20) CE hours.

== See also ==
Professional certification (Computer technology)
