= Charles Xavier Thomas =

French inventor and entrepreneur

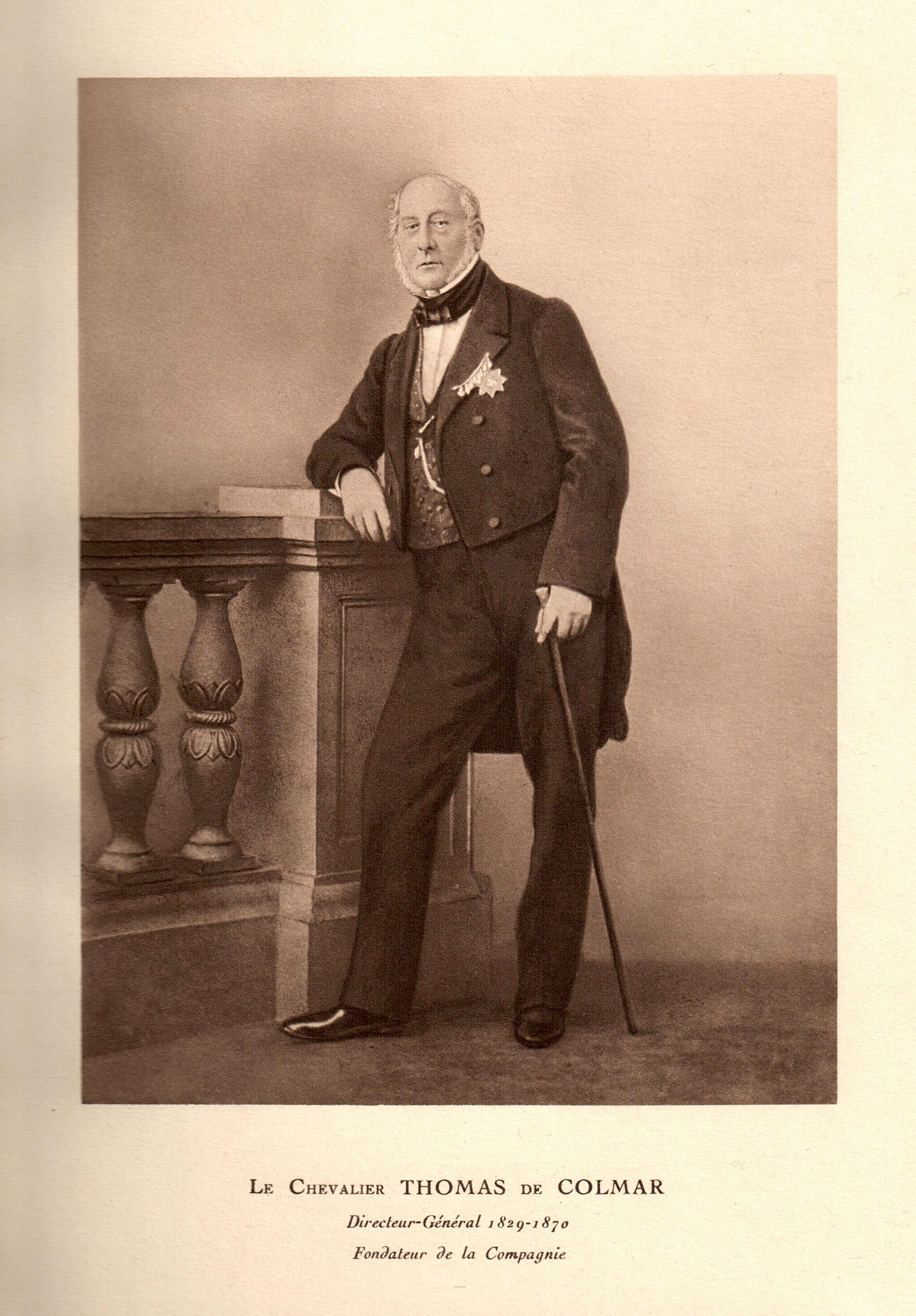
- Drawing of Charles Xavier Thomas
- Born: May 5, 1785; Colmar, France
- Died: March 12, 1870 (aged 84); Paris, France
- Known for: Arithmometer

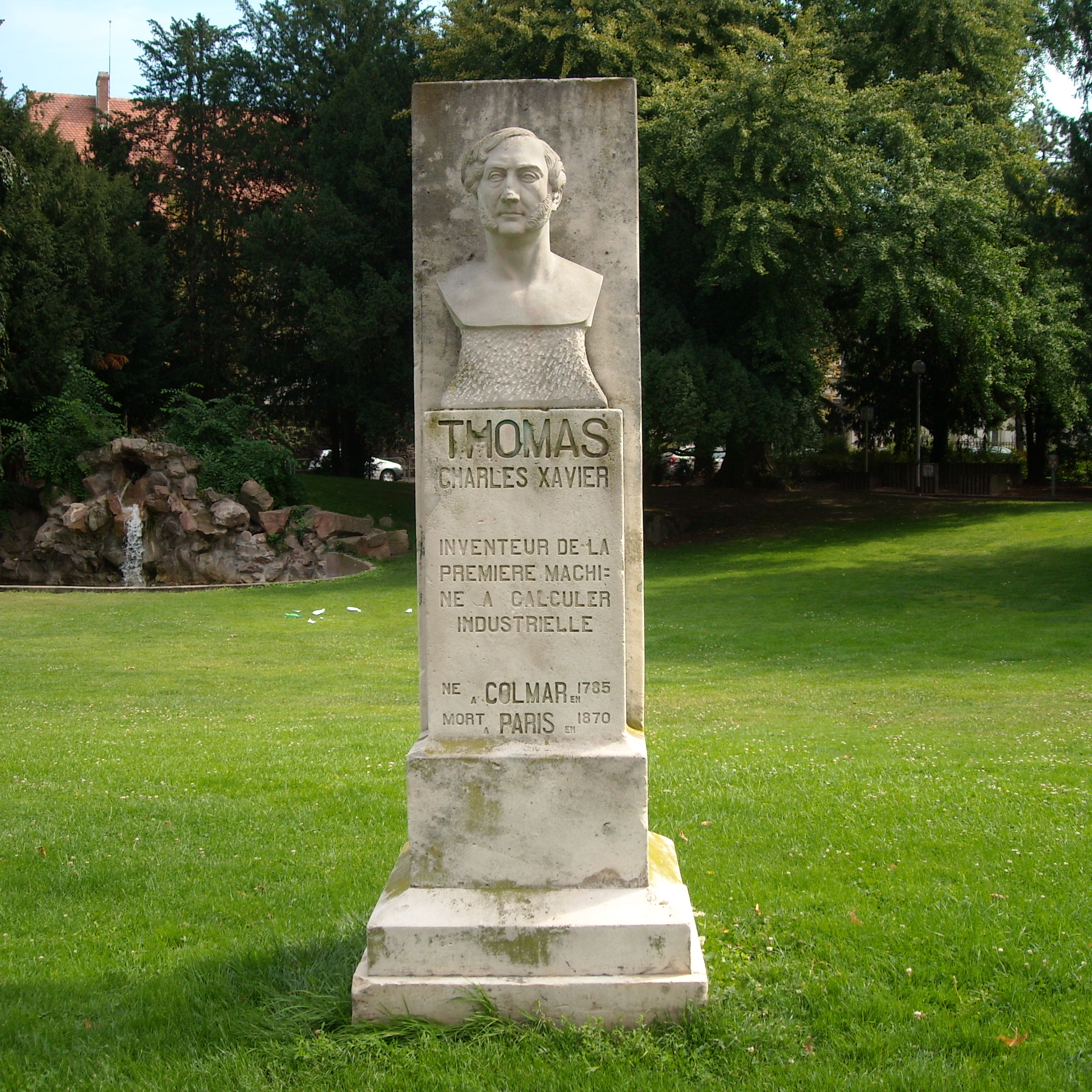
Monument in Colmar

Charles Xavier Thomas de Colmar (May 5, 1785–March 12, 1870) was a French inventor and entrepreneur best known for designing, patenting, and manufacturing the first commercially successful mechanical calculator, known as the Arithmometer. Additionally, he founded the insurance companies Le Soleil and L'aigle, which, under his leadership, became the number one insurance group in France during the early years of the Second Empire.

== Biography ==
Born Charles Xavier Thomas in Colmar, France, his father was a doctor and member of the town council. After a short employment in the French administration, Thomas joined the French army in 1809. By 1813, he had risen to the position of General Manager of the supply store for all the armies stationed in Spain. His responsibilities expanded further when he was appointed Inspector of Supply for the entire French army. It was during this period that he conceived the idea for the Arithmometer, recognizing the need for a tool to assist with the extensive calculations required for his duties.

After returning to civilian life, in 1819, he co-founded the fire insurance company "Phoenix." However, he left quickly because of the lack of support for his new ideas from his partners and shareholders. Ten years later, in 1829, he started the fire insurance company "Le Soleil," which he grew by merger and acquisitions until his death. In 1843 he started another insurance company called "L'Aigle incendie." By combining the symbol of the Sun (soleil), representing the previous kings of France, with the Eagle (aigle), reminiscent of Napoleon, he appealed to a broad spectrum of customers in the politically divided 19th-century France. At the time of his death, the "Aigle - Soleil" group stood as the largest insurance entity in France, with him owning 81% of it. Eighty years later, in 1946, it underwent nationalization and eventually merged with "La National" in 1968 to form the GAN company, which remains operational to this day.

=== Arithmometer ===
The first model of the Arithmometer was introduced in 1820, and as a result, Thomas was made Chevalier of the Legion of Honor in 1821. Despite this, Thomas spent all of his time and energy on his insurance business; therefore, there is a hiatus of more than thirty years in before the Arithmometer's commercialization in 1852. Because of the Arithmometer, he was raised to the level of Officier of the Légion d'honneur in 1857. By the time of his death in 1870, his manufacturing facility had built around 1,000 Arithmometers, making it the first mass-produced mechanical calculator in the world, and at the time, the only mechanical calculator reliable and dependable enough to be used in places like government agencies, banks, insurance companies, and observatories. The manufacturing of the Arithmometer went on for another 40 years until around 1914.

=== Personal life ===
He married Francesca (Frasquita) Garcia de Ampudia Alvarez in Seville in 1812. She came from an old Andalusian noble family. Together, they had ten children, including: Joseph Thomas d'Alvarez; Charlotte (Countess de Rancy); Louis Thomas, who married Livia Carafa, Duchess of Bojano and took the name of Thomas de Bojano; Frasquita (Mrs Soultzner d'Enschwyl); and Henriette (Countess de Dalmas).

== See also ==
- History of computing hardware
