= Certified wireless network administrator =

The Certified Wireless Network Administrator (CWNA) is a foundation level certification from the Certified Wireless Network Professionals (CWNP) that measures the ability to administer any wireless LAN. A wide range of topics focusing on the 802.11 wireless LAN technology is covered in the coursework and exam, which is vendor neutral.

== Certification track ==
The Certified Wireless Network Professionals (CWNP) is a vendor-neutral wireless LAN certification program with the following levels of certification:
Wi-Fi Certification Track

- Entry-Level Certifications

- CWSS® - Certified Wireless Sales Specialist
- CWTS® - Certified Wireless Technology Specialist

- Administrator Level Certifications

- CWNA® - Certified Wireless Network Administrator

- Professional Level Certifications

- CWSP® - Certified Wireless Security Professional
- CWAP® - Certified Wireless Analysis Professional
- CWDP® - Certified Wireless Design Professional

- Expert Level Certifications

- CWNE® - Certified Wireless Network Expert
- CWNT® - Certified Wireless Network Instructor

IoT Certification Track

- Administrator Level Certifications

- CPNAE® - Certified Python Network Administrator and Engineer
- CWISA® - Certified Wireless IoT Solutions Administrator

- Professional Level Certifications

- CWIIP® - Certified Wireless IoT Integration Professional
- CWIDP® - Certified Wireless IoT Design Professional.
- CWICP® - Certified Wireless IoT Connectivity Professional

- Expert Level Certifications

- CWISE® - Certified Wireless IoT Solutions Expert

A candidate can only achieve the expert level CWNE certification after earning the CWNA, CWSP, CWAP and CWDP certifications. A candidate no longer has to pass an exam for the expert level Certified Wireless Network Expert (CWNE) certification. In addition to passing the CWNA, CWSP, CWAP and CWDP a candidate must also provide: 3 professional endorsements, 3 years of documented enterprise Wi-Fi experience, 2 other current valid networking certifications and documentation of 3 enterprise Wi-Fi projects the candidate has participated in or led.

== CWNA requirements ==
The main subject areas covered by the CWNA are as follows:

- Radio Technologies
- Antenna Concepts
- Wireless LAN hardware and software
- Network Design Installation and Management
- Wireless Standards and Organization
- 802.11 Network Architecture
- Wireless LAN Security
- Troubleshooting
- How to perform site surveys

These subjects are covered at an introductory level in the CWNA coursework and examination. The other certifications specialize in one or more of these subjects.

== Recertification ==
The CWNA certification is valid for three years. The certification may be renewed by retaking the CWNA exam or by passing one of the 3 professional level certification exams (CWSP, CWAP or CWDP).

== See also ==
- Professional certification (Computer technology)
