= Timeline of computing 2010–2019 =

This article presents a detailed timeline of events in the history of computing from 2010 to 2019. For narratives explaining the overall developments, see the history of computing.

== 2010 ==
- April 6
  - Apple releases the original iPad.
- June 24
  - Apple releases the iPhone 4.

== 2011 ==
- May 4
  - Intel announces the commercialisation of 3D transistors, a variant of the FinFET.
- May 17
  - Lenovo releases the first ThinkPad X1.
- June 15
  - The first Chromebooks, by Acer and Samsung, go on sale.
- September 7
  - The first 4 terabyte hard drive is released by Seagate.

== 2012 ==
- February 29
  - Raspberry Pi, a bare-bones, low-cost credit-card sized computer created by volunteers mostly drawn from academia and the UK tech industry, is released to help teach children to code.
- September 11
  - Intel demonstrates its Next Unit of Computing, a motherboard measuring only 4 × 4 in (10 × 10 cm).
- October 4
  - TDK demonstrates a 2 terabyte hard drive on a single 3.5-inch platter.
- October 26
  - Microsoft releases the operating system Windows 8.
- November 18
  - Nintendo releases the Wii U in North America.

== 2013 ==
- June 15
  - Apple releases the first Retina Display MacBook Pro.
- September 20
  - Apple releases the iPhone 5s, powered by the Apple A7 SoC which the company proclaimed to be the first 64 bit processor to be used on a smartphone.
- November 15
  - Sony releases the PlayStation 4 in the United States and in Europe 2 weeks later on November 29.
- November 22
  - Microsoft releases Xbox One.

== 2014 ==
- August 6
  - Introduction of the RISC-V architecture with its instruction set.
- August 26
  - The first 8 terabyte hard drive is released by Seagate.
  - Google releases the 64-bit version of Chrome for Windows.
- August 29
  - Intel unveiled its first eight-core desktop processor, the Intel Core i7-5960X.

== 2015 ==
- July 29
  - Microsoft releases the operating system Windows 10.
- October 15
  - AlphaGo was the first Go AI computer program developed by Google to defeat a professional human opponent on a full-sized board without handicap.

== 2016 ==
- January 12
  - The High Bandwidth Memory 2 standard is released by JEDEC.
- January 13
  - Fixstars Solutions releases the world's first 13 TB SSD.
- March 4
  - Scientists at MIT create the first five-atom quantum computer with the potential to crack the security of traditional encryption schemes.

== 2017 ==
- March 2
  - AMD launches the Ryzen CPU architecture.
- March 3
  - Nintendo releases the hybrid gaming console Nintendo Switch.

== 2019 ==
- January 9
  - Lexar announces the first SD card which can store 1 terabyte.
- September 20
  - Google claims to have achieved quantum supremacy.
