= Timeline of computing 1990–1999 =

This article presents a detailed timeline of events in the history of computing from 1990 to 1999. For narratives explaining the overall developments, see the history of computing.

== 1990 ==
Date	Event
1990	Motorola releases the 68040 capable of 35 MIPS and integrated a far superior FPU. The 68040 was included in some of the Apple Macintosh and Commodore Amiga lineup.
March 19	Macintosh IIfx released. Based on a 40 MHz version of the 68030 it achieved 10 MIPS. It also had a faster SCSI adapter, which could transfer 3.0 Mbit/s.
May 22	Introduction of Windows 3.0 by Microsoft. It is a multitasking system that maintains compatibility with MS-DOS, allowing several MS-DOS tasks to be run at once on an 80386 or above. This created a real threat to the Macintosh and despite a similar product, IBM's OS/2, it was very successful.
June	Commodore releases the Amiga 3000, the first 32-bit Amiga. It used a Motorola 68030 processor and the upgraded ECS chipset. Amiga OS 2.0 was released with the launch of the A3000, which exploited its 32-bit architecture. Later variants included the Amiga 3000UX, launched as a low end UNIX workstation, running UNIX System V. The A3000T was the first Amiga to use a tower form factor, which increased expansion potential.
October 1	Microsoft Office released.
October 15	Macintosh Classic released, an identical replacement to the Macintosh Plus of January 1986. Also came the Macintosh IIsi which ran a 68030 processor at 20 MHz to achieve 5.0 MIPS, and also a 256 colour video adapter.
November 12	Tim Berners-Lee submitted a proposal to the management at CERN which coined the term WorldWideWeb.
November	Macintosh LC released. This ran a 68020 processor at 16 MHz to achieve 2.6 MIPS, it had a slightly improved SCSI adapter and a 256 colour video adapter.
1990	Multimedia PC (MPC) Level 1 specification published by a council of companies including Microsoft and Creative Labs. This specified the minimum standards for a Multimedia IBM PC. The MPC level 1 specification originally required a 12 MHz 80286 microprocessor, but this was later revised to require a 16 MHz 80386SX microprocessor as the 80286 was realised to be inadequate. It also required a CD-ROM drive capable of 150 kB/s (single speed) and also of Audio CD output. Companies can, after paying a fee, use the MPC logo on their product.

== 1991 ==
Date	Event
1991	Borland acquires Ashton-Tate Corporation and the Dbase program.
1991	Phil Zimmermann releases the public key encryption program PGP along with its source code, which quickly appears on the Internet.
March	Commodore release the CDTV, an Amiga multimedia appliance with CD-ROM drive but no floppy drive.
April 22	The Intel 80486 SX is released as a cheaper alternative to 80486 DX, with the key difference being the lack of an integrated FPU.
May	Creative Labs introduces the Sound Blaster Pro sound card.
June	To promote OS/2, Bill Gates took every opportunity after its release to say 'DOS is dead'; however, the development of DOS 5.0 led to the permanent dropping of OS/2 development. Unlike version 4, this version was properly tested through the distribution of beta versions to over 7,500 users. This version included the ability to load device drivers and TSR programs above the 640 KiB boundary (into UMBs and the HMA), freeing more RAM for programs. This version marked the end of collaboration between Microsoft and IBM on DOS.
August	The Linux kernel is born with the following post to the Usenet Newsgroup comp.os.minix by Linus Torvalds, a Finnish college student: "Hello everybody out there using minix- I'm doing a (free) operating system (just a hobby, won't be big and professional like gnu) for 386(486) AT clones." Linux has become one of the most widely used Unix-like operating system kernels in the world today. It originally only ran on Intel 386 processors, but years later added many different types of computers (now includes complete range from small to supercomputers and IBM mainframes), including Sun SPARC, DEC/Compaq Alpha, and many ARM, MIPS, PowerPC, and Motorola 68000 based computers. In 1992, the GNU project adopted the Linux kernel for use with GNU systems while they waited for the development of their own kernel, GNU Hurd, to be completed. The GNU project's aim is to provide a complete and free Unix-like operating system, combining the Hurd or Linux kernel with a complete suite of free software to run on it. Torvalds changed the licence of the Linux kernel from one prohibiting commercial use to the GNU General Public License on February 1, 1992.

== 1992 ==
Date	Event
1992	First 64-bit microprocessors; the first 64-bit variant of MIPS, the MIPS R4000 was introduced in 1992 (announced October 1, 1991) and another major RISC microprocessor, DEC Alpha (no longer produced), was also introduced in 1992. Intel had introduced the Intel i860 RISC microprocessor in 1989, marketed as a "64-bit microprocessor", while it had essentially a 32-bit architecture (non-pure "32/64-bit"), enhanced with a 3D graphics unit capable of 64-bit. Computers with 64-bit registers (but not addressing, and not microprocessors) had appeared decades earlier, as far back as IBM 7030 Stretch (considered a failure) in 1962, and in the Cray-1 supercomputer installed at Los Alamos National Laboratory in 1976.
1992	Windows NT addresses 2 gigabytes of RAM which is more than any application will ever need — Microsoft on the development of Windows NT.
?	Introduction of CD-i launched by Philips.
1992	The PowerPC 601, developed by IBM, Motorola and Apple Computer, was released. This was the first generation of PowerPC processors.
1992	The last "luggable" computer of the Compaq Portable series, the Compaq Portable 486, was released.
1992	IBM ThinkPad 700C laptop created. It was lightweight compared to its predecessors.
March	First release of 386BSD: the first fully operational Unix operating system to be completely free and open source, and to be able to ran on PC-compatible computer systems based on the 32-bit Intel 80386 ("i386").
April	Introduction of Windows 3.1
May	Wolfenstein 3D released by id Software
June	Sound Blaster 16 ASP introduced by Creative Labs.
October	Commodore International releases the Amiga 1200 and Amiga 4000. Both machines included the improved Advanced Graphics Architecture chipset. The 1200 had a 14 MHz 68020 processor; the 4000 had a 25 MHz 68040.
November 10	Digital Equipment Corporation introduces the Alpha AXP architecture and the Alpha-based DEC 3000 AXP workstations, DEC 4000 AXP departmental servers and the DEC 7000 AXP enterprise servers.

== 1993 ==
Date	Event
January 23	Mosaic graphical web browser launched.
1993	Commercial providers were allowed to sell Internet connections to individuals. Many people began using the Internet, especially with the new interface provided by the World-Wide Web (see 1989) and NCSA Mosaic.
1993	Release of the first version of ELOQUENS, a text-to-speech commercial software, from CSELT.
1993	The first web magazine, The Virtual Journal, is published but fails commercially.
1993	Novell purchases Digital Research; DR DOS becomes Novell DOS.
1993	The MP3 file format was published. This sound format later became the most common standard for music on PCs and later digital audio players.
March	Microsoft introduces MS-DOS 6.0, including DoubleSpace disk compression.
March 22	Intel releases the P5-based Pentium processor, 60 and 66 MHz versions. It has over 3.1 million transistors and can achieve up to 100 MIPS. John H. Crawford co-managed the design of the P5; Donald Alpert managed the architectural team; and Vinod K. Dham headed the P5 group.
May	MPC Level 2 specification introduced (see November 1990). This was designed to allow playback of a 15 frames per second video in a 320x240 pixel window. The key difference from MPC level 1 is the requirement of a CD-ROM drive capable of 300 kB/s (double speed). Products are also required to be tested by the MPC council, making MPC Level 2 compatibility a stamp of certification.
June	Severe Tire Damage made the first live music performance on the Internet, using MBone technology.
July 27	Microsoft released the Windows NT 3.1 operating system that supported 32-bit programs.
December 10	Doom was released by id Software. The PC began to be considered as a serious games-playing machine, reinforced by the earlier release in November of Sam & Max Hit the Road.

== 1994 ==
Date	Event
1994	Several major PC games are released, such as Command & Conquer, Alone in the Dark 2, Theme Park, Magic Carpet, Descent and Little Big Adventure. Other, less significant releases for the PC included Star Trek: The Next Generation: A Final Unity, Full Throttle and Terminal Velocity. This success of the PC as a games platform was partly due to and partly a cause of significantly increased PC ownership among the general public during the early–mid 1990s. This also reflected the rapidly increasing quality of games available for the PC.
1994	Peter Shor devises an algorithm which lets quantum computers determine the factorization of large integers quickly. This is the first interesting problem for which quantum computers promise a significant speed-up, and it therefore generates a lot of interest in quantum computers.
1994	DNA computing proof of concept on toy travelling salesman problem; a method for input/output still to be determined.
1994	Motorola released the 68060 processor.
1994	Adobe Photoshop 3.0 graphics editing software released.
June	Microsoft releases MS-DOS 6.22, containing disk compression under the name DriveSpace after settling a dispute with Stac over their compression program, Stacker. Microsoft had removed DoubleSpace from MS-DOS 6.21 in February after a jury found them guilty of patent infringement, and a judge later ordered Microsoft to recall all unsold infringing products worldwide. MS-DOS 6.22 was the last standalone version of MS-DOS released.
March 7	Intel released Pentium processor, 90 and 100 MHz versions.
March 14	Linus Torvalds released version 1.0 of the Linux kernel.
April 29	Commodore International declares bankruptcy. Commodore's assets were eventually sold to German PC manufacturer ESCOM in 1995.
August	IBM releases the IBM Simon a forerunner to the smartphone.
September	PC DOS 6.3 is released, essentially the same as version 5.0; this release by IBM included more bundled software, such as Stacker and anti-virus software.
October 10	Intel releases the Pentium processor, 75 MHz version.
December 1994	Netscape Navigator 1.0 web browser released. It was written as an alternative to NCSA Mosaic.
December 3	Sony releases its first PlayStation console in Japan; to date, over 100 million units have been sold.

== 1995 ==
Date	Event
?	Jaz drive removable hard disk storage introduced.
?	Zip drive removable floppy disk storage introduced.
March 1995	Linus released Linux Kernel v1.2.0 (Linux 95).
March 27, 1995	Intel released Pentium processor, 120 MHz version.
May 23, 1995	Sun Microsystems first announces Java at the SunWorld conference.
June 1, 1995	Intel released Pentium processor, 133 MHz version.
August 24, 1995	Microsoft releases Windows 95, replacing Windows 3.1 with a pre-emptively multitasked 32-bit operating system that integrated MS-DOS and Windows.
October 3, 1995	Be Inc. launch the BeBox, featuring two PowerPC 603 processors running at 66 MHz, and running their new operating system BeOS.
November 1, 1995	Intel released Pentium Pro, 150, 166, 180, and 200 MHz versions, on one day. It was the first product based on the P6 microarchitecture, later used in the Pentium II, III, M, and Core processors. It achieves 440 MIPS and contains 5.5 million transistors; this is nearly 2,400 times as many as the first microprocessor, the 4004; and capable of 70,000 times as many instructions per second.
November 6, 1995	3dfx releases Voodoo, the first consumer 3D accelerator, able to render scenes in real time and in high resolution. GLQuake (an OpenGL port of Quake) is the first popular game using this new technology. Other games soon follow, including Tomb Raider.
December 1995	JavaScript development announced by Netscape.
December 21, 1995	First public release of the Ruby programming language (version 0.95)
December 28, 1995	CompuServe blocked access to over 200 sexually explicit Usenet newsgroups, partly to avoid confrontation with the German government. Access to all but five groups was restored on February 13, 1996.

== 1996 ==
Date	Event
1996	Nokia released the Nokia 9000, the first of Nokia's smartphones.
1996	Quake released – representing the dramatic increases in both software and hardware technology since Doom, of three years prior. Other notable releases included Civilization 2, Tomb Raider, Command & Conquer: Red Alert and Grand Prix Manager 2. On the more controversial front Battlecruiser 3000AD was also released, but its advertising had to be censored.
January	Netscape Navigator 2.0 released. First browser to support JavaScript.
January	Windows 95 OSR2 (OEM System Release 2) was released – partly to fix bugs found in release 1 – but only to computer retailers for sale with new systems. There were actually two separate releases of Windows 95 OSR2 before the introduction of Windows 98, the second of which contained both USB and FAT32 support – the main selling points of Windows 98. FAT32 is a new filing system that provides support for disk partitions bigger than 2.1 GB and is better at coping with large disks (especially in terms of wasted space).
January 4	Intel released Pentium processor, 150 and 166 MHz versions.
April 17	Toshiba released the Libretto sub-notebook. With a volume of 821.1 cm^{3} and a weight of just 840 g, it was the smallest PC compatible computer to be released at that time.
June 9	Linux 2.0 released and it was a significant improvement over the earlier versions: it was the first to support multiple architectures (originally developed for the Intel 386 processor, it now supported Digital's Alpha architecture and would very soon support the SPARC architecture, and many others). It was also the first stable kernel to support SMP, kernel modules, and much more.
July 4	Hotmail, founded by Sabeer Bhatia and Jack Smith, is commercially launched on Independence Day in the United States, symbolically representing freedom from Internet service providers. (Hotmail is now owned and operated by Microsoft; it is rebranded as Outlook.com in 2013.)
July 14	The first public release of Opera, version 2.1 for Windows.
September 23	Audio Highway announced the Listen Up player, the first MP3 digital audio player. It was later released in September 1997.
October 6	Intel releases a 200 MHz version of the Pentium processor.
November	Telecom Italia released TIM Card, the first prepaid card for cellular phones in the world; designed by CSELT.
December	id Software releases QuakeWorld, a version of Quake designed for Internet multiplayer games. Several innovative features such as movement prediction make the game playable even over low-speed and high-latency Internet connections.

== 1997 ==
Date	Event
?	Tim Berners-Lee awarded the Institute of Physics' 1997 Duddell Medal for inventing the World Wide Web (see 1989).
?	Grand Theft Auto and Quake 2 were released while Lara Croft returned in Tomb Raider II. As standards for graphics kept increasing, 3D graphics cards were beginning to become mandatory for game players.
January 8	Intel released Pentium MMX, 166 and 200 MHz versions. Its MMX instruction set is designed to increase performance when running multimedia applications.
May 7	Intel releases the Pentium II processor, 233, 266, and 300 MHz versions. It has a larger on-chip cache and expanded instruction set.
May 11	IBM's Deep Blue became the first computer to beat a reigning World Chess Champion, Garry Kasparov, in a full chess match. The computer had played him before, losing 5/6 games in February 1996.
June 2	Intel released Pentium MMX, 233 MHz version.
August 6	After 18 months of losses Apple Computer was in serious financial trouble. Microsoft invested in Apple, buying 100,000 non-voting shares worth $150 million; many Apple owners disapproved. One condition was that Apple would drop the long-running court case; attempting to sue Microsoft for copying the look and feel of their operating system when designing Windows.
September	Internet Explorer 4.0 was released.

== 1998 ==
Date	Event
January	Compaq Computer Corporation announces pending acquisition of Digital Equipment Corporation for $9.6 billion.
February	Intel released the 333 MHz Pentium II processor. Code-named Deschutes, they used the new 0.25 micrometre manufacturing process, so they can run faster and generate less heat.
March	Be Inc. released BeOS R3. This was the first BeOS version available for x86 PCs and Power Macs.
May	Apple announces the iMac, an all-in-one with integral 15 inch (381 mm) multiscan monitor, 24× CD-ROM, 2× available USB ports, 56 kbit/s modem, two stereo speakers, and Ethernet, but no floppy drive. It was encased in translucent Bondi Blue and Ice plastic. Quantity shipping began in August. Designed by Jonathan Ive, it was the model that enabled Apple to become profitable again.
June 25	Microsoft released Windows 98. Some U.S. attorneys tried to block its release since the new OS interfaces with other programs, such as Microsoft Internet Explorer, and so effectively closes the market of such software to other companies. Microsoft has fought back with a letter to the White House suggesting that 26 of its industry allies say that a delay in the release of the new OS could damage the U.S. economy. The main selling points of Windows 98 were its support for USB and its support for disk partitions greater than 2 GB with FAT32 (although FAT32 was actually released with Windows 95 OSR2).
September	Upstart eMachines announces two home PCs priced at $399 and $499, creating the sub-$600 market and launching a price war. Within four months, the new company becomes the No. 5 computer maker at retail.

== 1999 ==
Date	Event
January 25	Linux Kernel 2.2.0 is released. The number of people running Linux is estimated at over 10 million, making it an important operating system in the Unix market, and increasingly so in the PC market.
February 22	AMD releases a K6-III clocked at 400 MHz and a 450 MHz version for OEMs. It contains about 23 million transistors, and requires motherboards using a Super Socket 7. It supports a 100 MHz front side bus (FSB), an improvement over AMD's prior chips that used a 66 MHz FSB. The use of a 100 MHz FSB brought technical equivalence with the 100 MHz FSB used on the Intel Pentium II.
August 31	Apple releases the Power Mac G4. It is powered by the PowerPC G4 chip from Motorola. Available in 400 MHz, 450 MHz and 500 MHz versions, Apple claimed it as the first personal computer to be capable of over one billion floating-point operations per second.
October 11	Nvidia releases Geforce 256, claiming to be the first consumer level Graphics Processor Unit with Transform and Lighting Engine.
November 29	AMD releases an Athlon clocked at 750 MHz.
