= Timeline of computing 2000–2009 =

This article presents a detailed timeline of events in the history of computing from 2000 to 2009. For narratives explaining the overall developments, see the history of computing.

== 2000 ==
Date	Event
January 14	The US Government announces that restrictions on exporting cryptography are being relaxed (although not removed). This allows many US companies to stop the long running process of having to create US and international copies of their software.
January 19	Transmeta releases the Crusoe microprocessor. The Crusoe was intended for laptops and consumed significantly less electricity than most microprocessors of the time, while providing comparable performance to the mid-range Pentium II microprocessors. Transmeta and Crusoe, new competitors to Intel and their products, initially appeared exciting and promising.
February 17	Microsoft releases Windows 2000.
March	Be Inc. released BeOS R5 for PowerPC and x86, which was the first release of BeOS for x86 to have a freely downloadable version which could be fully installed on a user's hard drive.
March 4	Sony releases the PlayStation 2.
March 6	AMD released an Athlon clocked at 1 GHz.
March 8	Intel releases very limited supplies of the 1 GHz Pentium III chip.
June 20	British Telecom (BT) claim the rights to hyperlinks on the basis of a US patent granted in 1989. Similar patents in the rest of the world have now expired.
June 29	IBM delivers the ASCI White supercomputer to the U.S. Department of Energy. This supercomputer was capable of performing 12.3 teraflops, making it the world's fastest at the time.
September 6	RSA Security released their RSA algorithm into the public domain, in advance of the US patent (#4,405,829) expiring on September 20 of the same year. Following the relaxation of the US government restrictions earlier in the year (January 14) this removed one of the last barriers to the worldwide distribution of much software based on cryptographic systems. The IDEA algorithm is still under patent; government restrictions still apply in some places.
September 14	Microsoft releases Windows Me.
November	The Ericsson R380, the first phone running Symbian OS was released.
November 20	Intel releases the Pentium 4. The processor is built using the NetBurst microarchitecture, a new design since the introduction of the P6 microarchitecture used in the Pentium Pro in late 1995.

== 2001 ==
Date	Event
January 4	Linux kernel version 2.4.0 released.
January 9	Apple introduces iTunes, a digital media player application that later revolutionized digital music distribution.
January 15	Wikipedia is launched.
February 1	Foundation of the newco Loquendo as a spin-off of the CSELT's voice technology group.
February	The Agile Manifesto, which crystallised and named a growing trend towards more "agile" processes in software development, was released. The perceived success of agile project management led to agile approaches such as Scrum later being used as a general project management approach in other fields, not just in software development or even in computing.
March 24	Apple released macOS (as Mac OS X). This was a new operating system derived from NeXTSTEP, using Darwin as its kernel, an Open Source operating system based on BSD. This replaced the "classic" Mac OS for its Mac computers. Mac OS X finally gave Mac users the stability benefits of a protected memory architecture along many other enhancements, such as pre-emptive multitasking. The BSD base also makes porting Unix applications to Mac OS X easier and gives Mac users a full-featured command line interface alongside their GUI.
September 14	Nintendo releases their sixth generation home console, the GameCube.
October 25	Microsoft released Windows XP, based on Windows 2000 and Windows NT kernel. Windows XP introduces a heavily redesigned GUI and brings the NT kernel to the consumer market.
November 15	Microsoft releases the Xbox in North America.

== 2002 ==
Date	Event
March 4	RIM (now BlackBerry Ltd) released the first BlackBerry smartphone.
April 24	Microsoft releases Windows Server 2003, an operating system designed for server management and enterprise-level applications.
May 30	United Linux officially formed.
September 7	Blender, a 3D graphics software package, becomes open-source software after a crowdfunding campaign successfully raises €100,000.

== 2003 ==
Date	Event
February	Nvidia releases GeForce FX, a family of DirectX 9.0-compatible 3D cards with extensive support for pixel and vertex shaders. With this new product Nvidia makes an emphasis on image quality, proclaiming a "dawn of cinematic computing", illustrated with the popular Dawn demo utilising extremely realistic skin and wing shaders.
March 6	SCO Group announces it would sue IBM for US$1 billion. The claim is that Linux contains code inserted by IBM that was the copyrighted property of SCO (see SCO v. IBM).
March 12	Intel releases the Pentium M for notebooks and the Centrino mobile platform. The Pentium M delivers similar or higher performance than the Pentium 4-M while consuming less power.
April 22	AMD releases the Opteron line of server processors. The Opteron is the successor of the Athlon MP, and introduces the 64-bit K8 microarchitecture.
September 23	AMD releases the Athlon 64. The Athlon 64 is built on the K8 microarchitecture and is the first 64-bit processor widely available to the consumer market.
December 17	Linux kernel version 2.6.0 is released.

== 2004 ==
Date	Event
April	Sony released Librié EBR-1000EP in Japan, the first e-book reader with an E Ink electronic paper display.
April 1	Google announces Gmail.
April 14	Nvidia releases GeForce 6800, marking the biggest leap in graphics technology for the company. Independent reviews report more than 100% increase in productivity compared to the fastest card on the market. Continuing the tradition, the company demonstrates Nalu, a mermaid with extremely realistic hair. A few weeks later, rival ATI announces the X800 series with nearly the same level of performance and feature support. The card is showcased by the Ruby demo, delivering a smooth real-time rendering of what was previously in the exclusive realm of prerendered cinematics.
October 20	The first release of the Ubuntu Linux distribution.
October 20	Infineon Technologies pleads guilty to charges of DRAM price fixing, resulting in a $160 million fine. SK Hynix Semiconductor, Samsung Electronics, and Elpida Memory later plead guilty to the same.
November 9	Firefox 1.0 released, which later became Microsoft Internet Explorer's biggest competitor since Netscape Navigator.
November 21	Nintendo releases the Nintendo DS, introducing dual screens and touchscreen technology to handheld gaming.

== 2005 ==
Date	Event
February 26	Jef Raskin, who in 1979 envisioned and established the Macintosh project at Apple Computer, dies at the age of 61.
April 29	Apple Computer releases Mac OS X Tiger (v10.4) for PowerPC-based Macs.
May 25	Nokia announces the Nokia 770 Internet Tablet, the first device running Maemo.
May 26	Intel releases the Pentium D, their first dual-core 64-bit desktop processor.
May 31	AMD releases the Athlon 64 X2, their first dual-core 64-bit desktop processor.
June 6	Apple announces they are going to use Intel processors in upcoming Macintosh computers.
July 22	Microsoft announces their next consumer operating system, Windows Vista (previously "Longhorn"), to be released in early 2007.
November 22	Microsoft releases the Xbox 360.

== 2006 ==
Date	Event
January 5	Intel releases the Core brand. These are mobile 32-bit single-core and dual-core processors that were built using a modified design of the Pentium M's microarchitecture.
January 10	Apple Computer introduces the MacBook Pro, their first Intel-based, dual-core mobile computer, as well as an Intel-based iMac.
May 8	Retail launch of the first dedicated PPU PhysX from Ageia
June 19	Researchers create experimental processor that operates at higher than 500 GHz when cryogenically frozen.
July 15	Twitter is launched, introducing a new platform for microblogging and social interaction.
July 27	Intel releases the Core 2 processor.
September 26	Intel announces plans for an 80-core processor that would exceed 1 TFLOP, planned to be available in 2011.
October 9	Google announces acquisition of YouTube in $1.65 billion deal, recognizing the growing importance of video content on the internet.
November 11	Sony releases the PlayStation 3.
November 19	Nintendo releases the Wii.
December 24	AmigaOS 4 was released by Hyperion Entertainment (VOF) under license from Amiga, Inc. for AmigaOne registered users.

== 2007 ==
Date	Event
January 7	The first iPhone was introduced by Apple.
January 30	Microsoft Corporation launches Windows Vista more than 5 years after their last major, new operating system, Windows XP, was released.
June 5	Asus announces the first Asus Eee PC, launching the netbook category of mobile computers. It initially ran Linux; later models also offered a choice of Windows.
October 26	Apple launches Mac OS X Leopard (v10.5)
November 19	AMD releases the Phenom line of high performance processors, positioning the Athlon as a mid-range line.

== 2008 ==
Date	Event
February 19	Blu-ray wins the high definition optical disc format war against HD DVD, becoming the industry standard for high-definition media.
September 2	The first public beta version of the Google Chrome web browser was released. Chrome subsequently became the most popular web browser in the world, overtaking Internet Explorer.
September 23	The first version of Android was introduced by Google.
October 22	The HTC Dream (T-Mobile G1), the first commercially available device to run the Android operating system, was released.

== 2009 ==
Date	Event
January 3	The online currency Bitcoin is released.
May	Facebook overtakes MySpace in America.
August 28	Apple launches MacOS X Snow Leopard (v10.6)
September 1	Sony releases the PS3 Slim.
October 22	Microsoft releases Windows 7.

== See also ==
- Information Age
