= Helmut Schreyer =

German inventor, electrical engineer and computer pioneer (1912–1984)

- Born: 4 July 1912; Delitzsch, German Empire
- Died: 12 December 1984 (aged 72); Santa Teresa (Rio de Janeiro)
- Citizenship: German, Brazilian
- Education: Technische Universität Berlin
- Known for: Electrical circuit technology, Z1, Z3
- Scientific career
- Fields: Electrical engineering, Computer science
- Workplaces: Institut für Schwingungsforschung (i.e. radio-frequency engineering; part of Technische Universität Berlin), Instituto Militar de Engenharia

Helmut Theodor Schreyer (4 July 1912 – 12 December 1984) was a German inventor. He is mostly known for his work on the Z3, the world's first programmable computer.

== Early life ==
Helmut Schreyer was the son of the minister Paul Schreyer and Martha. When his father started to work in a parish in Mosbach, the young Schreyer went to a school there. He earned his Abitur in 1933.

== Career ==
Schreyer started to study electronic and telecommunications engineering at the Technische Hochschule in Charlottenburg (now Technische Universität Berlin) in 1934. He got to know Konrad Zuse at the company AV Motiv in 1935. In 1938 Schreyer earned his diploma and then worked as a graduate assistant for Prof Wilhelm Stäblein. Another assistant of Stäblein was Herbert Raabe, who had worked at AEG's research division until 1936.

=== World War II ===
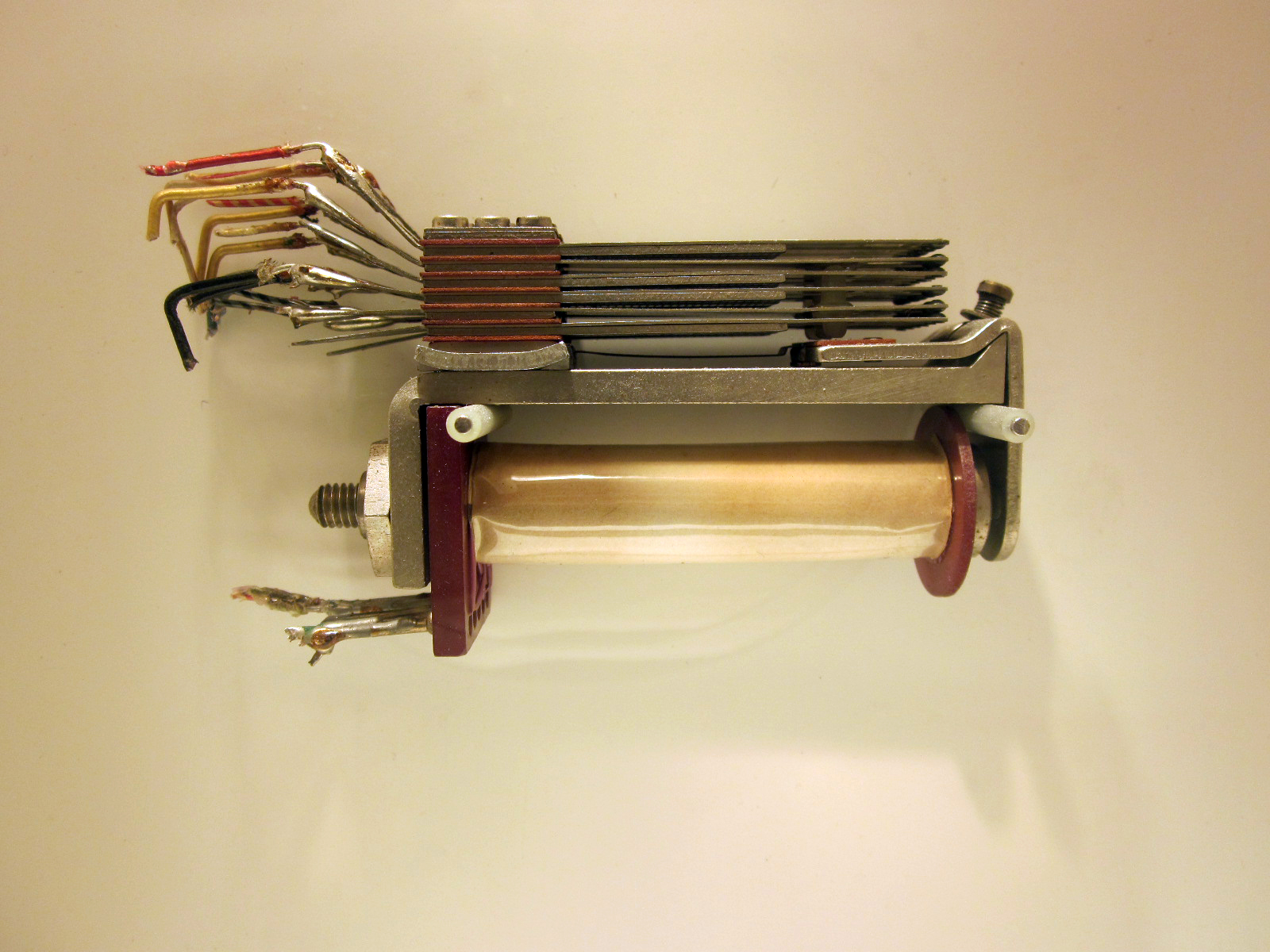
Electromagnetic memory (relays) included in the Z3, Z5, and Z11

In 1939, when World War II started, Schreyer applied for exemption from the drafting for military service, on the basis that his work was important for the war efforts of Nazi Germany. Schreyer submitted to the German government a plan to build a large electronic computer. This plan was rejected by the Nazi German military, because the war was expected to only last a couple of years and building the electronic computer Schreyer envisaged, would have taken much longer. Among others, Schreyer worked on detection technology for unexploded ordnance. He then worked on the accelerometer for the V-2-rocket. Schreyer's prototype of this accelerometer was destroyed, when he fled to Vienna on a train, during the last days of World War II. Schreyer also worked on technology to convert the radar signal into an audio signal which the pilot of a fighter aircraft might recognize.

Konrad Zuse invented and built the Z-series of personal computers between 1936 and 1945. Zuse was a schoolmate and co-worker of Schreyer, who advised Zuse on relays. Subsequently, Zuse built the Z3 computer, integrating relays as arithmetic logic unit. The Z3 computer was completed in 1941 and used 2,600 relays, with the distinction of being the first computer that was fully operational, controlled entirely automatically, and being a calculating machine. Schreyer had theorized on the use of electrical circuit technology to implement computers, but while he first considered it practically infeasible, he subsequently could not get the necessary funding for his theory. Up to 1942 Schreyer himself built an experimental model of a computer using 100 vacuum tubes, which was lost at the end of World War II.

Schreyer planned to build a computer memory for 1000 words in 1943, that was to contain several thousand electron tubes, but the war put an end to all larger plans. In 1944 he built an electrical circuit to convert decimal to binary numbers.

=== After World War II ===
Schreyer had fled to Vienna in the final days of World War II, where he went to the Brazilian Embassy, and he was issued with a Brazilian passport. He then fled to Brazil, where he was offered work at the Army's Technical School (ETE). In 1950 Schreyer's book on electronic digital computers was published in the Portuguese language by the ETE.

While teaching at the Pontifical Catholic University of Rio de Janeiro (PUC-Rio) Schreyer alongside other faculty members of staff, supervised students for an end-of-term electronics project. The computer that was assembled by the students, nicknamed Lourinha (blondie), was the first computer to be designed and assembled in Brazil.

== Publications ==
- Technische Rechenmaschine, 1939 (i.e. Technical computing machines, cf. Brian Randell, ed.: The origins of digital computers. Selected papers. Springer, Berlin, Heidelberg, 1982).
- Das Röhrenrelais und seine Schaltungstechnik. Technische Hochschule Berlin, Dissertation 1941.
  (i.e. Vacuum tube relays and circuit technology)
- Patent: Schaltungsanordnung eines elektrischen Kombinationsspeicherwerkes. Patent application on June 11, 1943 (published in December 1955).
  (i.e. Circuit layout for combinatorial electronic memory) Espacenet-Link.
- An Experimental Model of an Electronic Computer. IEEE Annals of the History of Computing 12 #3 (July–September 1990): 187–197.
  (Description of the development and construction of a model to test the feasibility of an electronic computer; written in 1977 about his work during the period 1941–1943.)
- Medidas Em Comunicaçoes
- Circuitos de Comutação (computadores Eletrônicos Digitais), 1966
- Envio Imediato Circuitos de Comutação. Oficina do I.M.E., Rio de Janeiro 1966
- Computadores Eletrônicos Digitais, 1967
