= Horst Zuse =

German computer scientist

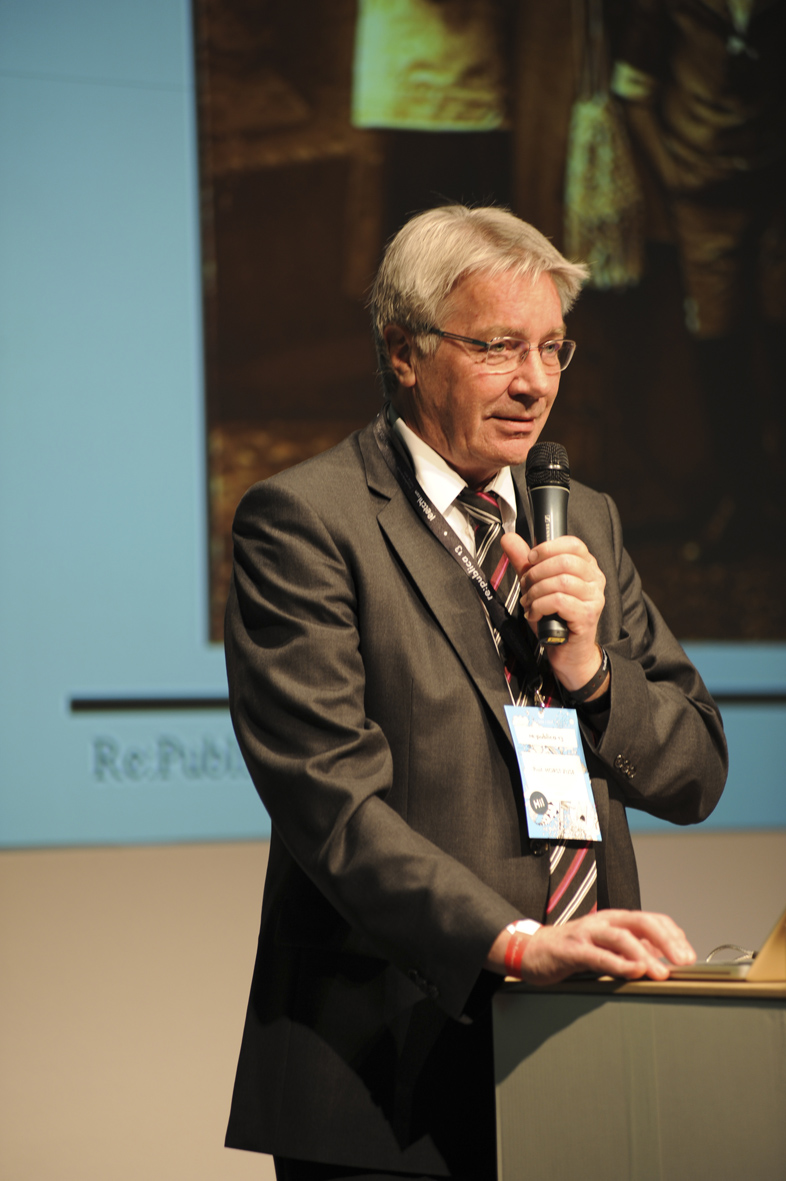
- Born: 17 November 1945 (age 80); Bad Hindelang, Allied-occupied Germany
- Citizenship: German
- Education: Technische Universität Berlin
- Known for: History of computer science
- Awards: Sputnik Medal (issued by the Cosmonautics Federation, 2000, in Moscow)
- Scientific career
- Fields: Software engineering

Horst Zuse (born 17 November 1945) is a German computer scientist.

== Life ==
Zuse is the son of the computer pioneer Konrad Zuse. He first studied electrical engineering at Technische Universität Berlin and later on completed his PhD on software metrics. Zuse worked as a Privatdozent at Technische Universität Berlin and was professor at the Hochschule Lausitz (FH), University of Applied Sciences. Besides software engineering, he has concentrated on the history of computer science.

From 1997 to 2003, he and Raúl Rojas directed the reconstruction of Konrad Zuse's Z3 electromechanical computer, thought by many to be the first fully automatic, programmable digital computer. It is now on display in the Konrad Zuse Museum in Hünfeld, Germany. In 2008, he started another reconstruction of the Z3 by himself and presented it in 2010 at the same museum.

== Books ==
- A Framework of Software Measurement (Walter de Gruyter, 1997), ISBN 3-11-015587-7
- Software complexity: Measures and methods (Programming complex systems) (Walter de Gruyter, 1991), ISBN 0-89925-640-6
