= Calculating Space =

Book by Konrad Zuse

- Author: Konrad Zuse
- Original title: Rechnender Raum
- Language: German
- Subject: Automata theory
- Genre: Non-fiction
- Publication date: 1969
- Publication place: Germany

An elementary process in Zuse's Calculating Space: Two digital particles A and B form a new digital particle C.

Calculating Space (German: Rechnender Raum) is Konrad Zuse's 1969 book on automata theory. He proposed that all processes in the universe are computational. This view is known today as the simulation hypothesis, digital philosophy, digital physics or pancomputationalism. Zuse proposed that the universe is being computed by some sort of cellular automaton or other discrete computing machinery, challenging the long-held view that some physical laws are continuous by nature. He focused on cellular automata as a possible substrate of the computation and pointed out that the classical notions of entropy and its growth do not make sense in deterministically computed universes.

== See also ==
- A New Kind of Science
- Simulated reality
