= Konrad Zuse =

German computer scientist and engineer (1910–1995)

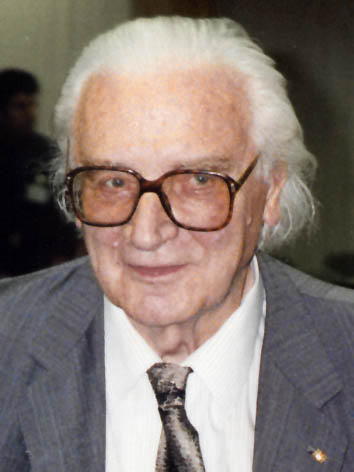
- Konrad Zuse in 1992
- Born: Konrad Ernst Otto Zuse; 22 June 1910; Berlin, Prussia, German Empire
- Died: 18 December 1995 (aged 85); Hünfeld, Hesse, Germany
- Education: Technische Universität Berlin
- Known for: Z3, Z4; Plankalkül; Calculating Space (cf. digital physics); Montagestraße SRS 72; Helixturm
- Awards: Werner von Siemens Ring in 1964; Harry H. Goode Memorial Award in 1965 (together with George Stibitz); Wilhelm Exner Medal, 1969; Order of Merit of the Federal Republic of Germany in 1972; Computer History Museum Fellow Award in 1999
- Scientific career
- Fields: Computer science; Computer engineering
- Workplaces: Aerodynamic Research Institute

Signature
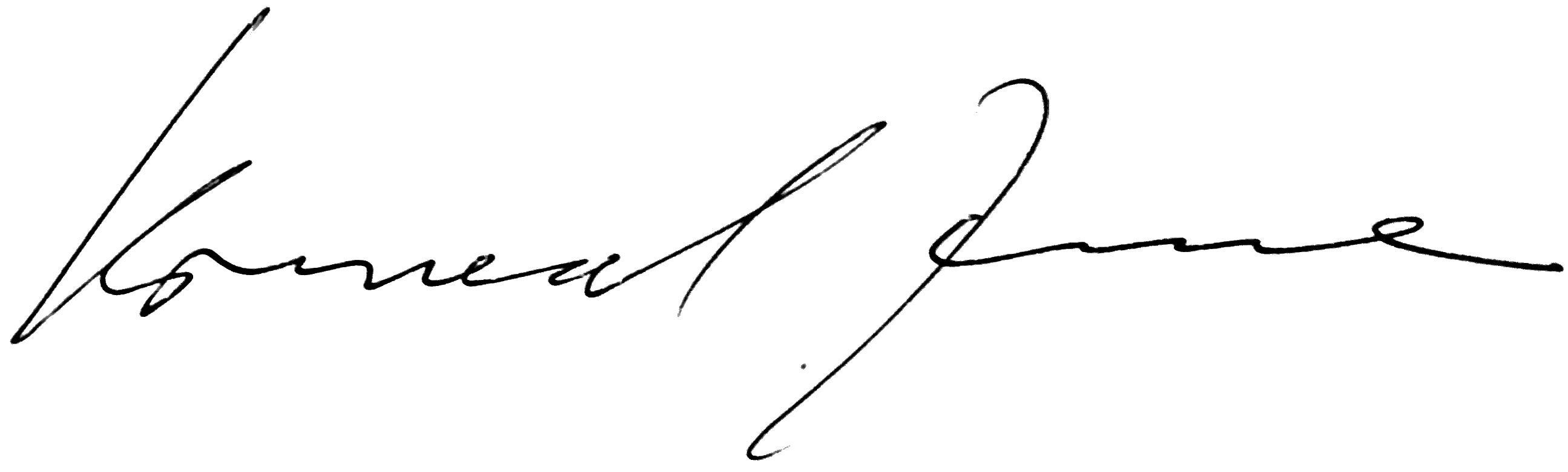

Konrad Ernst Otto Zuse (/ˈzuːsə/; German: [ˈkɔnʁaːt ˈtsuːzə]; 22 June 1910 – 18 December 1995) was a German civil engineer, pioneering computer scientist, inventor and businessman. His greatest achievement was the world's first programmable computer; the functional program-controlled Turing-complete Z3 became operational in May 1941. Thanks to this machine and its predecessors, Zuse is regarded by some as the inventor and father of the modern computer.

Zuse was noted for the S2 computing machine, considered the first process control computer. In 1941, he founded one of the earliest computer businesses, producing the Z4, which became the world's first commercial computer. From 1943 to 1945 he designed Plankalkül, the first high-level programming language. In 1969, Zuse suggested the concept of a computation-based universe in his book Rechnender Raum (Calculating Space).

Much of his early work was financed by his family and commerce, but after 1939 he was given resources by the government of Nazi Germany. Due to World War II, Zuse's work went largely unnoticed in the United Kingdom and United States. Possibly his first documented influence on a US company was IBM's option on his patents in 1946. The Z4 also served as the inspiration for the construction of the ERMETH, the first Swiss computer and one of the first in Europe.

== Early life and education ==
Konrad Zuse was born in Berlin on 22 June 1910. In 1912, his family moved to East Prussian Braunsberg (now Braniewo in Poland), where his father was a postal clerk. Zuse attended the Collegium Hosianum in Braunsberg, and in 1923, the family moved to Hoyerswerda, where he passed his Abitur in 1928, qualifying him to enter university.

He enrolled at Technische Hochschule Berlin (now Technische Universität Berlin) and explored both engineering and architecture, but found them boring. Zuse then pursued civil engineering, graduating in 1935.

== Career ==
After graduation, Zuse worked for the Ford Motor Company, using his artistic skills in the design of advertisements. He started work as a design engineer at the Henschel aircraft factory in Schönefeld near Berlin. This required the performance of many routine calculations by hand, leading him to theorize and plan a way of doing them by machine.

Beginning in 1935, he experimented in the construction of computers in his parents' flat on Wrangelstraße 38, moving with them into their new flat on Methfesselstraße 10, the street leading up the Kreuzberg, Berlin. Working in his parents' apartment in 1936, he produced his first attempt, the Z1, a floating-point binary mechanical calculator with limited programmability, reading instructions from a perforated 35 mm film.

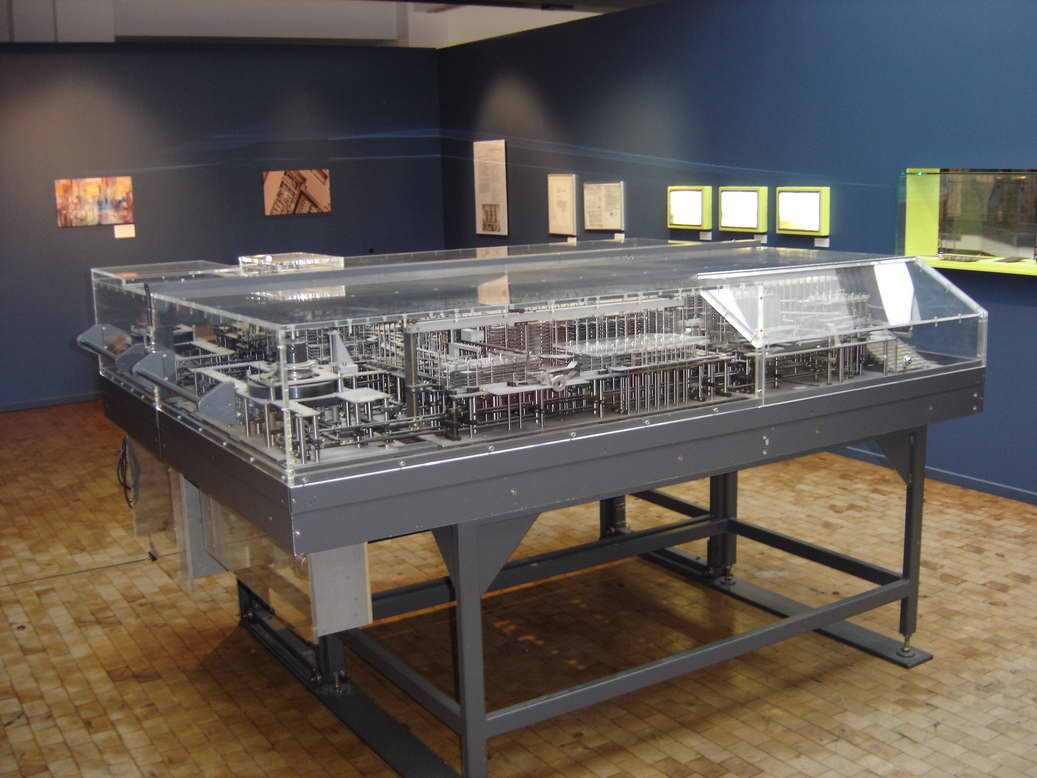
Zuse Z1 replica in the German Museum of Technology in Berlin

In 1937, Zuse submitted two patents that anticipated a von Neumann architecture. In 1938, he finished the Z1 which contained some 30,000 metal parts and never worked well due to insufficient mechanical precision. On 30 January 1944, the Z1 and its original blueprints were destroyed with his parents' flat and many neighbouring buildings by a British air raid in World War II.

Zuse completed his work entirely independently of other leading computer scientists and mathematicians of his day. Between 1936 and 1945, he was in near-total intellectual isolation.

=== 1939–1945 ===
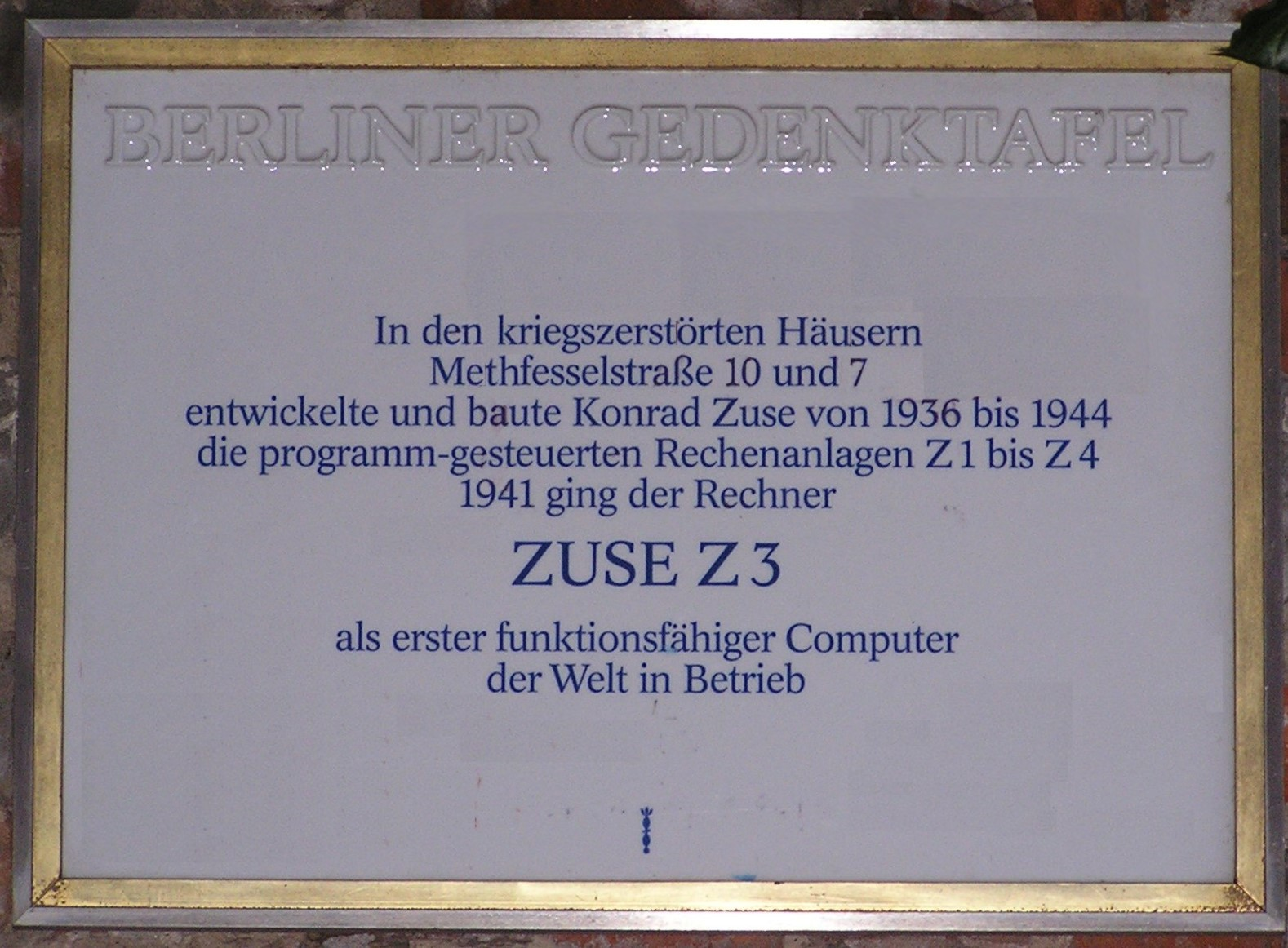
Plaque commemorating Zuse's work, attached to the ruin of Methfesselstraße 7, Berlin

In 1939, Zuse was called to military service, where he was given the resources to ultimately build the Z2. In September 1940 Zuse presented the Z2, covering several rooms in the parental flat, to experts of the Deutsche Versuchsanstalt für Luftfahrt (DVL; German Research Institute for Aviation). The Z2 was a revised version of the Z1 using telephone relays.

In 1940, the German government began funding him and his company through the Aerodynamische Versuchsanstalt (AVA, Aerodynamic Research Institute, forerunner of the DLR), which used his work for the production of glide bombs. Zuse built the S1 and S2 computing machines, which were special purpose devices which computed aerodynamic corrections to the wings of radio-controlled flying bombs. The S2 featured an integrated analog-to-digital converter under program control, making it the first process-controlled computer.

In 1941 Zuse started a company, Zuse Apparatebau (Zuse Apparatus Construction), to manufacture his machines, renting a workshop on the opposite side in Methfesselstraße 7 and stretching through the block to Belle-Alliance Straße 29 (renamed and renumbered as Mehringdamm 84 in 1947).

In 1941, he improved on the basic Z2 machine, and built the Z3. On 12 May 1941 Zuse presented the Z3, built in his workshop, to the public. The Z3 was a binary 22-bit floating-point calculator featuring programmability with loops but without conditional jumps, with memory and a calculation unit based on telephone relays. The telephone relays used in his machines were largely collected from discarded stock. Despite the absence of conditional jumps, the Z3 was a Turing complete computer. However, Turing-completeness was never considered by Zuse (who was unaware of Turing's work and had practical applications in mind) and only demonstrated in 1998 (see History of computing hardware).

The Z3, the first fully operational electromechanical computer, was partially financed by German government-supported DVL, which wanted their extensive calculations automated. A request by his co-worker Helmut Schreyer—who had helped Zuse build the Z3 prototype in 1938—for government funding for an electronic successor to the Z3 was denied as "strategically unimportant".

Statue of Zuse in Bad Hersfeld

In 1937, Schreyer had advised Zuse to use vacuum tubes as switching elements; Zuse at this time considered it a "crazy idea" (Schnapsidee in his own words). Zuse's workshop on Methfesselstraße 7 (along with the Z3) was destroyed in an Allied Air raid in late 1943 and the parental flat with Z1 and Z2 on 30 January the following year, whereas the successor Z4, which Zuse had begun constructing in 1942 in new premises in the Industriehof on Oranienstraße 6, remained intact.

On 3 February 1945, aerial bombing caused devastating destruction in the Luisenstadt, the area around Oranienstraße, including neighbouring houses. This event effectively brought Zuse's research and development to a complete halt. The partially finished, telephone relay-based Z4 computer was then packed and moved from Berlin on 14 February, arriving in Göttingen approximately two weeks later.

These machines contributed to the Henschel Werke Hs 293 and Hs 294 guided missiles developed by the German military between 1941 and 1945, which were the precursors to the modern cruise missile. The circuit design of the S1 was the predecessor of Zuse's Z11. Zuse believed that these machines had been captured by occupying Soviet troops in 1945.

While working on his Z4 computer, Zuse realised that programming in machine code was too complicated. He started working on a PhD thesis detailing the first high-level programming language, Plankalkül ("Plan Calculus") and, as an elaborate example program, the first real computer chess engine.

=== 1945–1995 ===
After the 1945 Luisenstadt bombing, he fled from Berlin to the rural Allgäu. In the extreme deprivation of post-war Germany Zuse was unable to build computers.

Zuse founded one of the earliest computer companies: the Zuse-Ingenieurbüro Hopferau. Capital was raised in 1946 through ETH Zurich and an IBM option on Zuse's patents.

In 1947, according to the memoirs of the German computer pioneer Heinz Billing from the Max Planck Institute for Physics, there was a meeting between Alan Turing and Konrad Zuse in Göttingen. The encounter had the form of a colloquium. Participants were John Womersley, Turing, Arthur Porter from England and a few German researchers like Zuse, Helmut Schreyer, Alwin Walther, and Billing.

It was not until 1949 that Zuse was able to resume work on the Z4. He would show the computer to the mathematician Eduard Stiefel of the ETH Zurich. The two men settled a deal to lend the Z4 to the ETH.

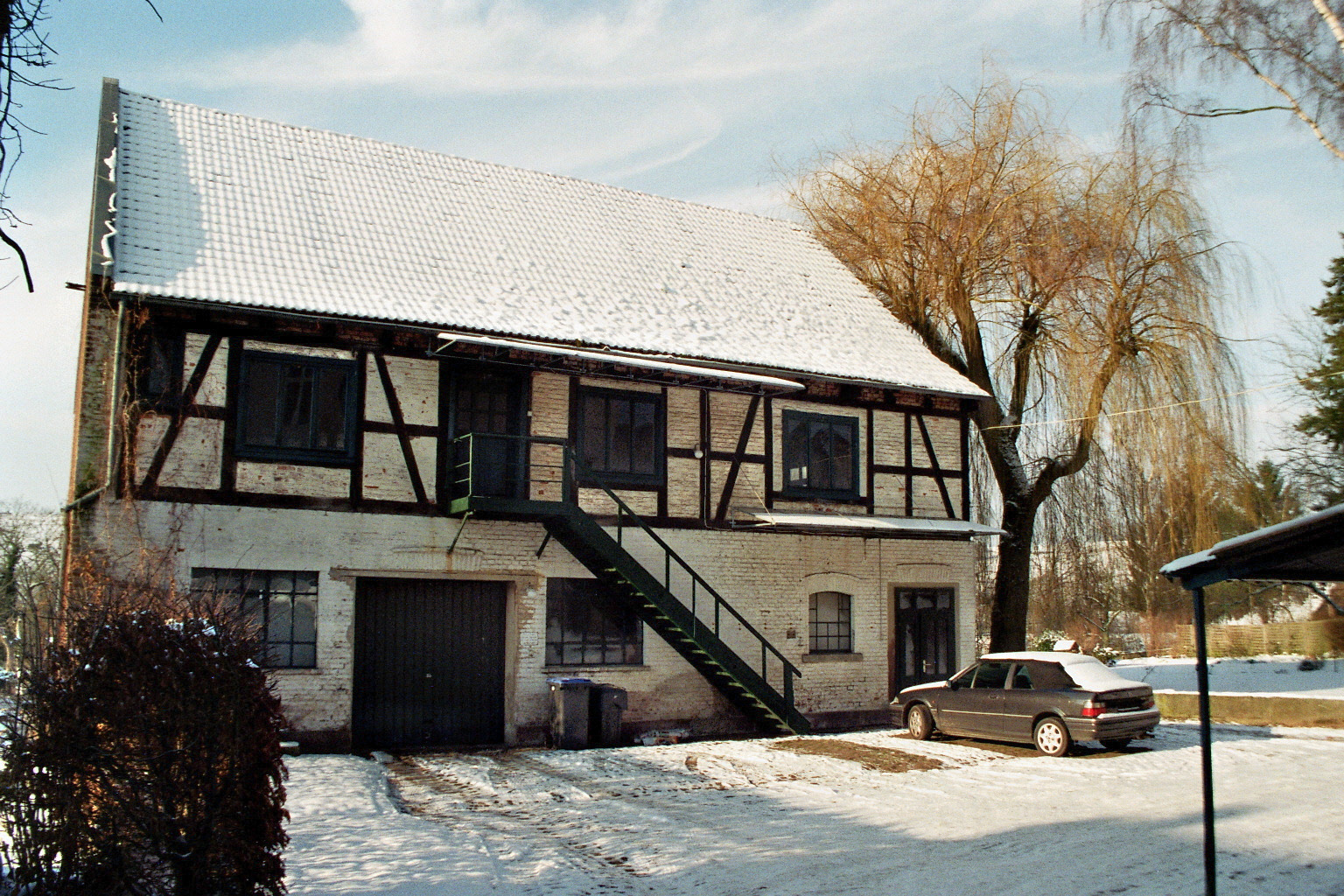
Zuse's workshop at Neukirchen, 2010

In November 1949, Zuse founded another company, Zuse KG, in Haunetal-Neukirchen; in 1957, the company's head office moved to Bad Hersfeld. The Z4 was finished and delivered to the ETH Zurich in July 1950, where it proved very reliable. At that time, it was the only working digital computer in Central Europe, and the second computer in the world to be sold or loaned, beaten only by the BINAC, which never worked properly after it was delivered. Other computers, all numbered with a leading Z, up to Z43, were built by Zuse and his company. Notable are the Z11, which was sold to the optics industry and to universities, and the Z22, the first computer with a memory based on magnetic storage.

Unable to do any hardware development, he continued working on Plankalkül, eventually publishing some brief excerpts of his thesis in 1948 and 1959; the work in its entirety, however, remained unpublished until 1972. The PhD thesis was submitted at University of Augsburg, but it was rejected because Zuse forgot to pay the DM 400 university enrollment fee. The rejection did not bother him.

Plankalkül slightly influenced the design of ALGOL 58 but was itself implemented only in 1975 in a dissertation by Joachim Hohmann. Heinz Rutishauser, one of the inventors of ALGOL, wrote: "The very first attempt to devise an algorithmic language was undertaken in 1948 by K. Zuse. His notation was quite general, but the proposal never attained the consideration it deserved." Further implementations followed in 1998 and then in 2000 by a team from the Free University of Berlin. Donald Knuth suggested a thought experiment: What might have happened had the bombing not taken place, and had the PhD thesis accordingly been published as planned?

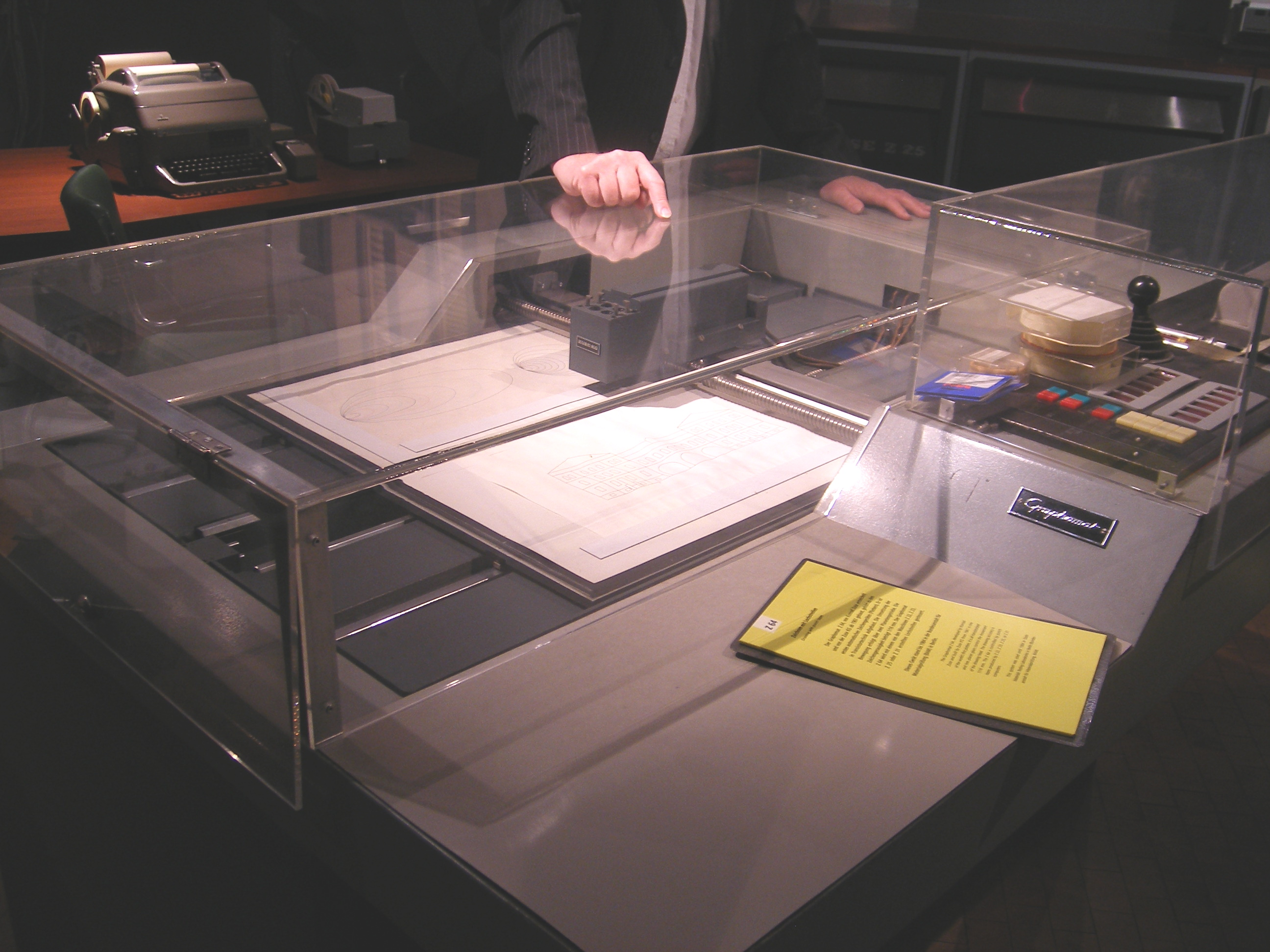
Z64 Graphomat plotter

In 1956, Zuse began to work on a high precision, large format plotter. It was demonstrated at the 1961 Hanover Fair, and became well known also outside of the technical world thanks to Frieder Nake's pioneering computer art work. Other plotters designed by Zuse include the ZUSE Z90 and ZUSE Z9004.

An elementary process in Zuse's Calculating Space: Two digital particles A and B form a new digital particle C.

In 1967, Zuse suggested that the universe itself is running on a cellular automaton or similar computational structure (digital physics); in 1969, he published the book Rechnender Raum (translated into English as Calculating Space).

Between 1989 and 1995, Zuse conceptualized and created a purely mechanical, extensible, modular tower automaton he named "helix tower" ("Helixturm"). The structure is based on a gear drive that employs rotary motion (e.g. provided by a crank) to assemble modular components from a storage space, elevating a tube-shaped tower; the process is reversible, and inverting the input direction will deconstruct the tower and store the components. In 2009, the Deutsches Museum restored Zuse's original 1:30 functional model that can be extended to a height of 2.7 m. Zuse intended the full construction to reach a height of 120 m, and envisioned it for use with wind power generators and radio transmission installations.

Between 1987 and 1989, Zuse recreated the Z1, suffering a heart attack midway through the project. It cost 800,000 DM (approximately $500,000) and required four individuals (including Zuse) to assemble it. Funding for this retrocomputing project was provided by Siemens and a consortium of five companies.

== Personal life ==
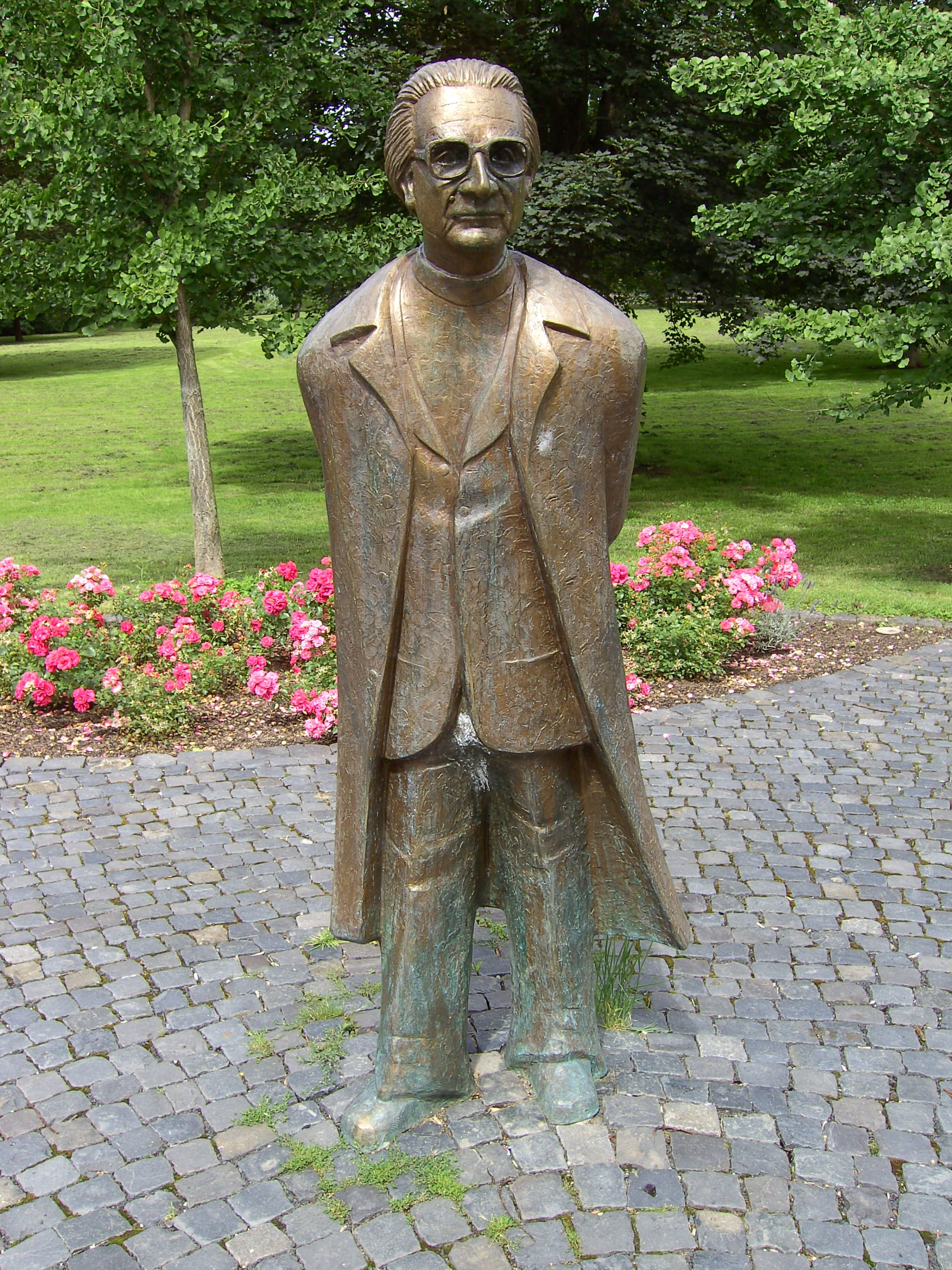
Zuse Memorial in Hünfeld, Hesse

Konrad Zuse married Gisela Brandes in January 1945, employing a carriage, himself dressed in tailcoat and top hat and with Gisela in a wedding veil, for Zuse attached importance to a "noble ceremony". Their son Horst, the first of five children, was born in November 1945.

While Zuse never became a member of the Nazi Party, he is not known to have expressed any doubts or qualms about working for the Nazi war effort. Much later, he suggested that in modern times, the best scientists and engineers usually have to choose between either doing their work for more or less questionable business and military interests in a Faustian bargain, or not pursuing their line of work at all.

After Zuse retired, he focused on his hobby of painting. He signed his paintings as "Kuno [von und zu] See".

Zuse was an atheist.

Zuse died on 18 December 1995 in Hünfeld, Hesse (near Fulda) from heart failure.

== Awards and honours ==
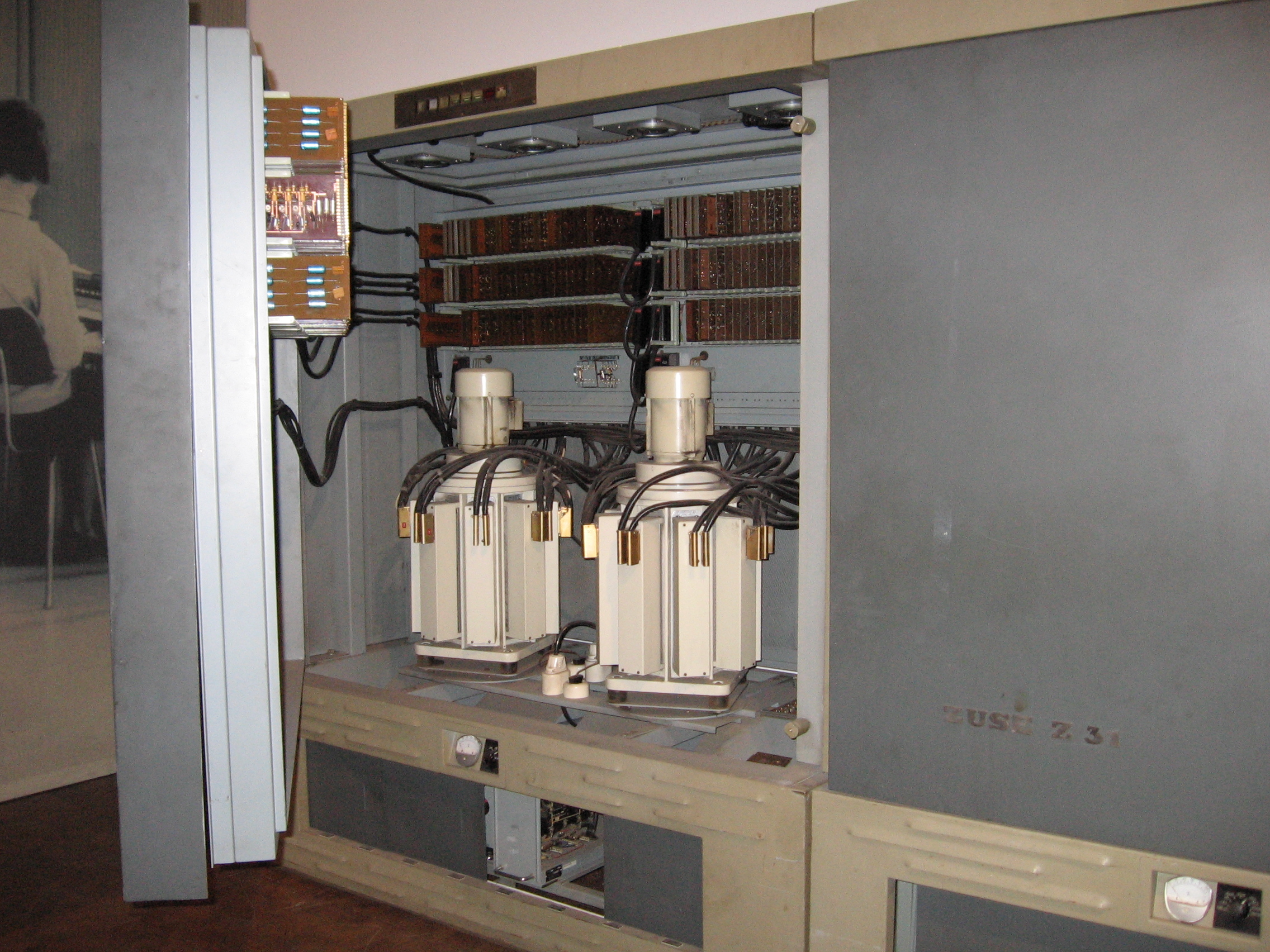
Magnetic drum storage inside a Z31 (which was first displayed in 1963)

Zuse received several awards for his work:

- Werner von Siemens Ring in 1964 (together with Fritz Leonhardt and Walter Schottky)
- Harry H. Goode Memorial Award in 1965 (together with George Stibitz)
- Wilhelm Exner Medal in 1969.
- Bundesverdienstkreuz in 1972 – Great Cross of Merit
- Computer History Museum Fellow Award in 1999 "for his invention of the first program-controlled, electromechanical, digital computer and the first high-level programming language, Plankalkül."

The Zuse Institute Berlin is named in his honour.

The Konrad Zuse Medal of the Gesellschaft für Informatik, and the Konrad Zuse Medal of the Zentralverband des Deutschen Baugewerbes (Central Association of German Construction), are both named after Zuse.

A replica of the Z3, as well as the original Z4, is in the Deutsches Museum in Munich. The Deutsches Technikmuseum in Berlin has an exhibition devoted to Zuse, displaying twelve of his machines, including a replica of the Z1 and several of Zuse's paintings.

The 100th anniversary of his birth was celebrated by exhibitions, lectures and workshops.

== See also ==
- John Vincent Atanasoff – American computer pioneer (1903–1995)
- List of German inventors and discoverers
- Reverse Polish notation – Mathematics notation where operators follow operands
- Self-replicating machine – Device able to make copies of itself
- Z5 (computer) – German electromechanical relay computer, 1953
- Z23 (computer) – Transistorized computer delivered from 1961 to 1967
- Z25 (computer)
- List of pioneers in computer science
