= Z5 (computer) =

German electromechanical relay computer, 1953

- Developer: Konrad Zuse
- Manufacturer: Zuse KG
- Released: July 1953; 72 years ago
- Lifespan: 5 years
- Introductory price: DM 300,000 (equivalent to DM 812,445 in 2021)
- CPU: @ ca. 40 Hz
- Memory: 720 relays, 36 bit word length, 12 cells
- Power: 5000 watts
- Predecessor: Z4

The Z5 was an electromechanical relay computer designed by Konrad Zuse and manufactured by Zuse KG following a commission from Ernst Leitz GmbH in Wetzlar in 1950. Delivered in July 1953, it was the first commercial built-to-order mainframe in Germany. The machine was purchased to support the design and optimisation of optical lens systems, a computationally intensive task that had previously required large teams of human computers.

== Background ==
Konrad Zuse began building automatic calculating machines in 1936, working initially in his parents' apartment in Berlin. His Z3 (1941), constructed from 2,600 telephone relays, is recognised as the world's first programmable, fully automatic digital computer; it was destroyed in an Allied bombing raid in 1944. The Z4, completed in 1945, survived the war after Zuse transported it by horse-drawn cart to Hinterstein in Bavaria to avoid the fighting. Leased to the ETH Zürich in 1950, the Z4 became the first computer to be commercially operated in continental Europe.

Zuse founded his own company, Zuse KG, in Bad Hersfeld in 1949 to manufacture and sell computers commercially. The Z5 was the company's first machine built to a specific customer's order rather than as a general-purpose product for sale. Ernst Leitz GmbH, based in Wetzlar and internationally known as the manufacturer of Leica cameras and precision optical instruments, including microscopes and binoculars, needed a machine capable of solving the complex systems of equations involved in tracing light rays through multi-element lens assemblies — calculations that governed the aberration characteristics and performance of new lens designs.

== Design ==
Like the Z3 and Z4, the Z5 was built using relay logic rather than vacuum tubes. Zuse had concluded that the vacuum tubes available in early 1950s Germany were insufficiently reliable for a machine intended for continuous commercial operation, whereas relays, though slower and physically larger, were robust and well understood. The Z5 used approximately 720 relays for its working memory, storing 12 words each of 36-bit length in floating-point format, the same word length as the Z4.

Despite the similarities in design philosophy, the Z5 was considerably faster than its predecessor. Its relay-based arithmetic unit could complete an addition in approximately 0.1 seconds, a multiplication in 0.4 seconds and a division in 0.7 seconds, making it around six times faster than the Z4. The machine consumed approximately 5,000 watts and weighed around 2,000 kg (4,400 lb).

The Z5 incorporated punched tape readers for input, a capability the Z4 had lacked. It supported conditional branching and five nested subroutine loops, which gave it sufficient programmability to handle the iterative ray-tracing computations required by Leitz's optical design team. The Plankalkül programming language that Zuse had developed in the 1940s influenced the programming approach, though by this period practical programs were written in machine-level notation.

== Specifications ==
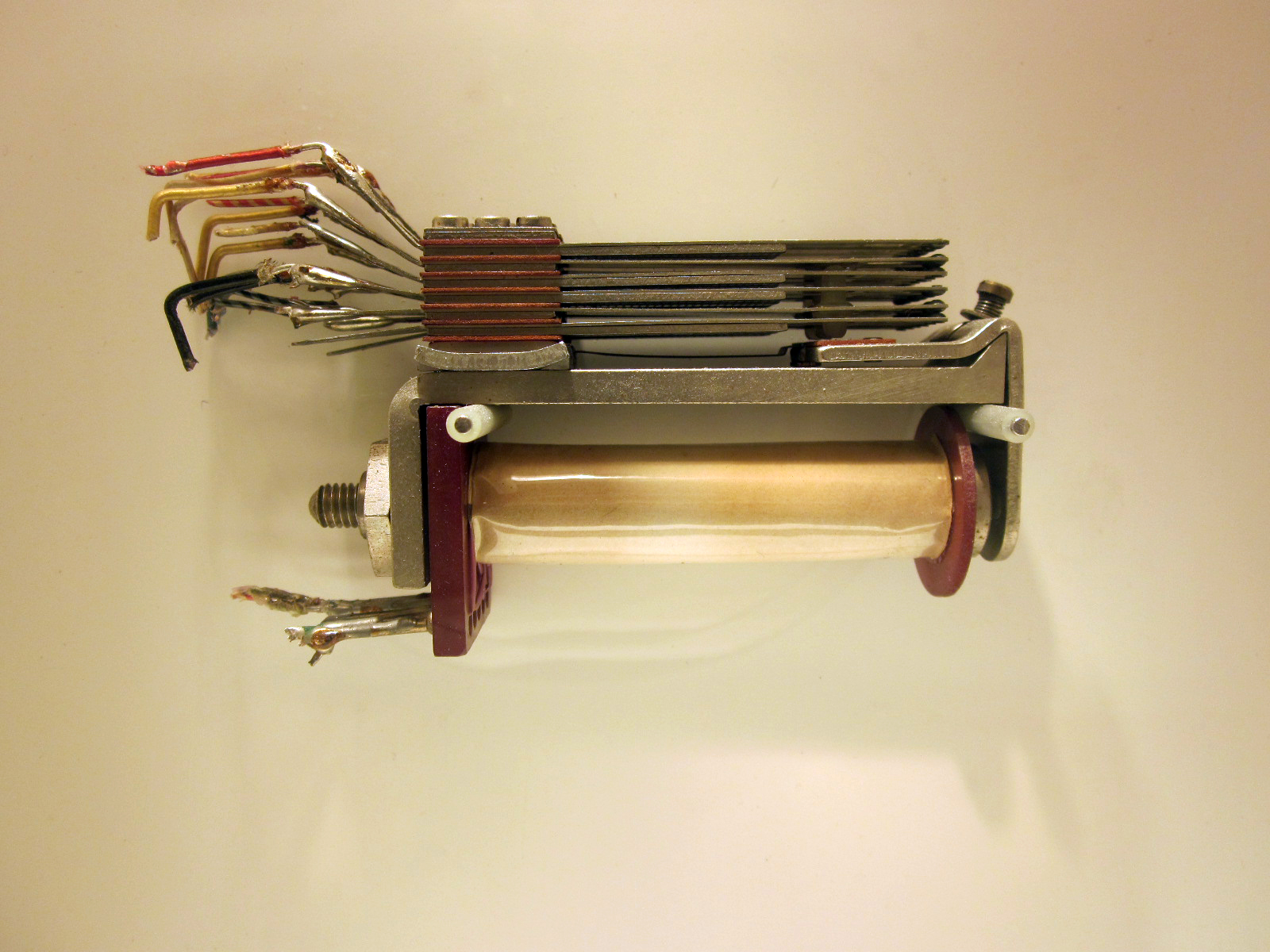
Electromagnetic relay memory as used in the Z3, Z5 and Z11

- Frequency: ca. 40 Hz
- Arithmetic unit: Floating-point numbers (36-bit word length)
- Memory: 12 words, 36 bits each
- Speed: addition 0.1 s, multiplication 0.4 s, division 0.7 s
- Power consumption: 5,000 watts
- Weight: ca. 2,000 kg (4,400 lb)
