= Z2 (computer) =

1940 electromechanical computer

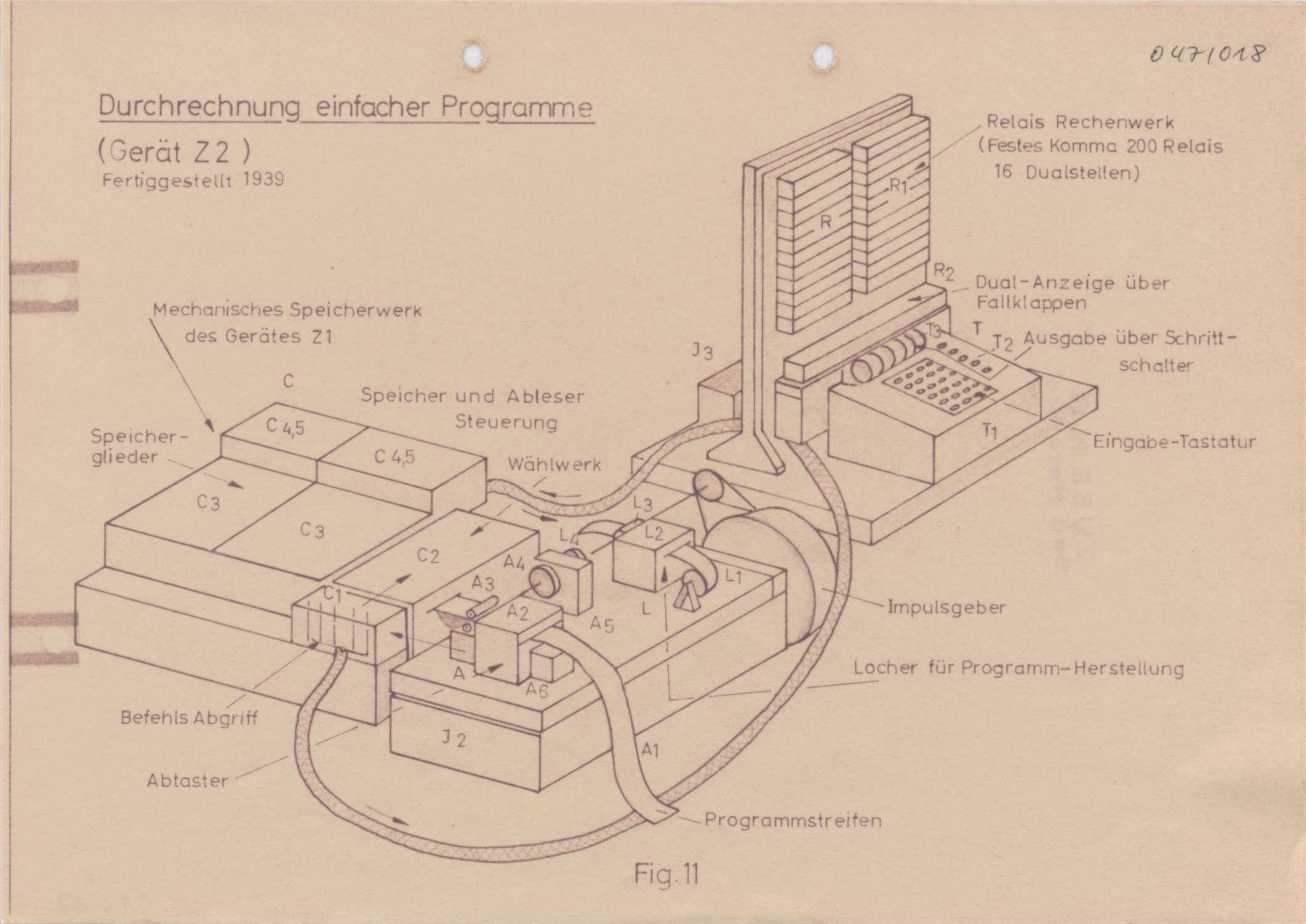
- Drawing of the Zuse Z2
- Developer: Konrad Zuse
- Type: Electromechanical (mechanical and relay-based) digital computer
- Released: 1940; 86 years ago
- CPU: 600 electrical relay circuits @ ca. 5 Hz
- Memory: 64 words
- Removable storage: Punch cards
- Power: 1000 watts
- Weight: 300 kg (660 lb)
- Predecessor: Z1
- Successor: Z3

The Z2 was an electromechanical (mechanical and relay-based) digital computer that was completed by Konrad Zuse in 1940. It was an improvement on the Z1 Zuse had built in his parents' home, which used the same mechanical memory. In the Z2, he replaced the arithmetic and control logic with 600 electrical relay circuits, weighing over 600 pounds.

The Z2 could read 64 words from punch cards. Photographs and plans for the Z2 were destroyed by the Allied bombing during World War II. In contrast to the Z1, the Z2 used 16-bit fixed-point arithmetic instead of 22-bit floating point.

Zuse presented the Z2 in 1940 to members of the DVL (today DLR) and member Alfred Teichmann, whose support helped fund the successor model Z3.

== Specifications ==
Frequency
c. 5 Hz
Arithmetic unit
Fixed point arithmetic unit with 16 bit word length
Average calculation time
0.8 sec for addition operation
Number of relays
600
Memory
64 words (same as Z1)
Power consumption
1000 watts
Weight
300 kg (660 lb)

== See also ==
- Z4
