= Raúl Rojas =

Mexican computer scientist and academic

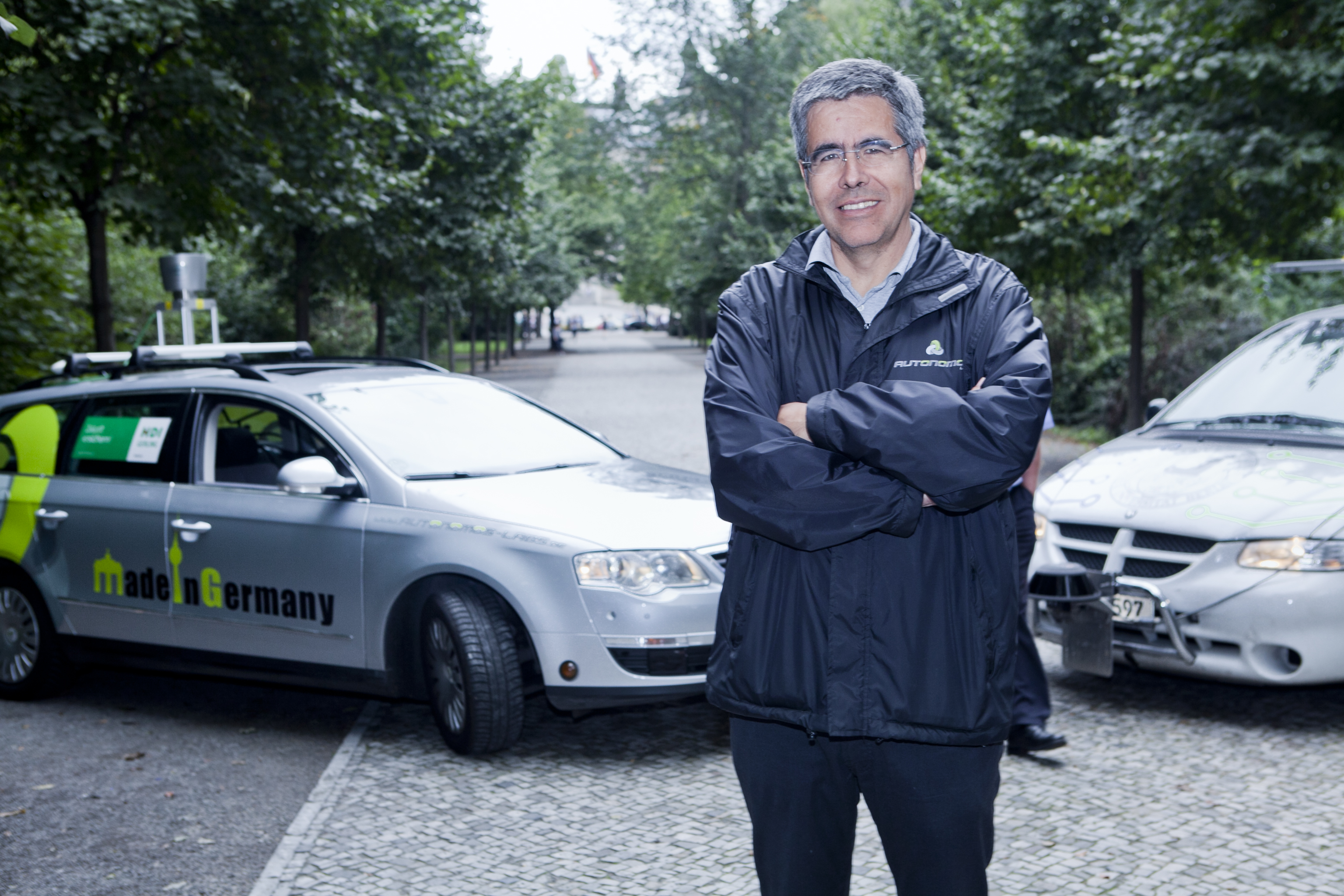
Rojas in August 2011

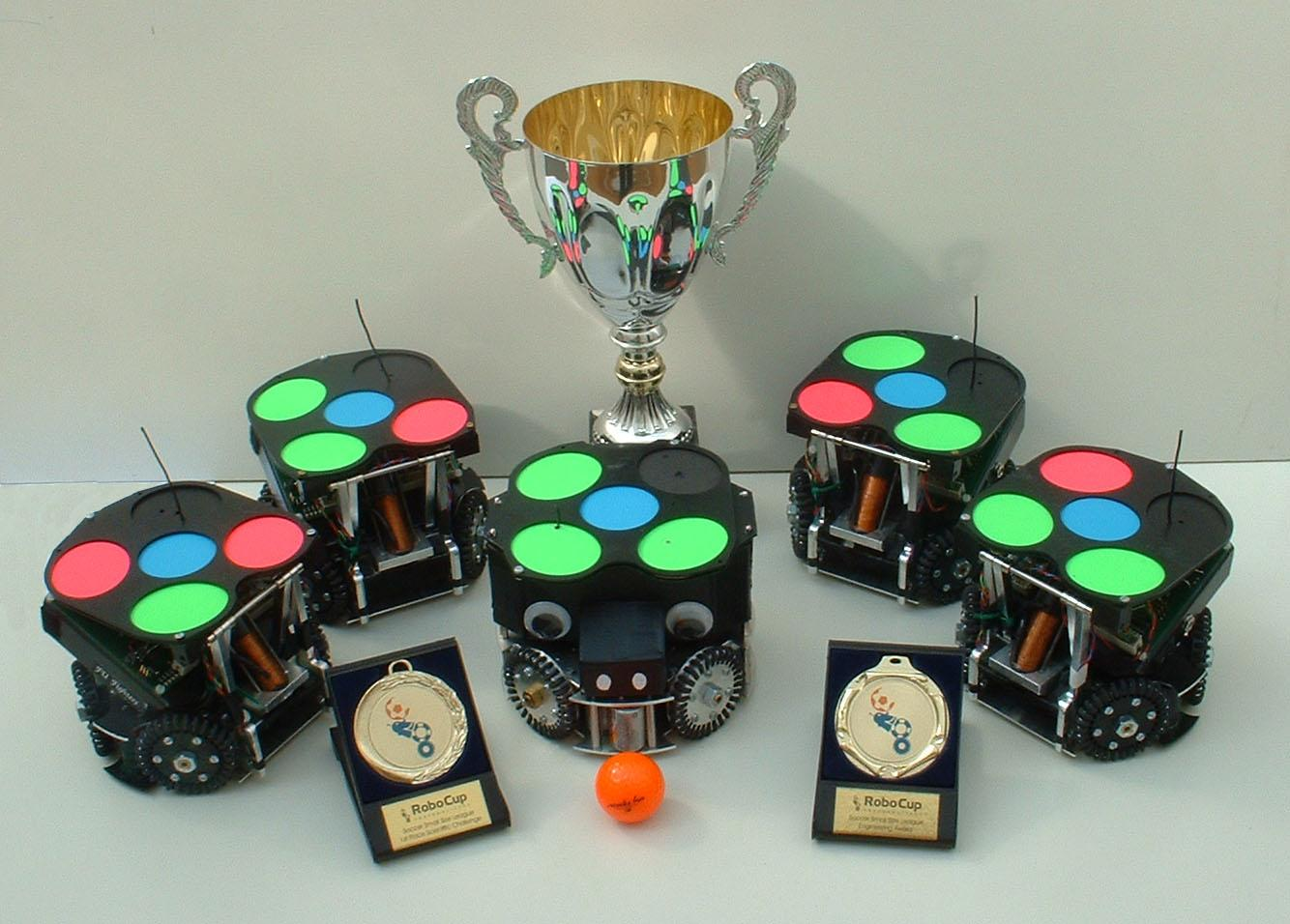
FU-Fighters, World Champion 2004, 2005: artificial intelligence football robots created by the team around Raúl Rojas

Raúl Rojas González (born 1955, in Mexico City) is a Mexican emeritus professor of Computer Science and Mathematics at the Free University of Berlin, and a renowned specialist in artificial neural networks. The FU-Fighters, football-playing robots he helped build, were world champions in 2004 and 2005. He is now leading an autonomous car project called Spirit of Berlin.

He and his team were awarded the Wolfgang von Kempelen Prize for his work on Konrad Zuse and the history of computers. Although most of his current research and teaching revolves around artificial intelligence and its applications, he holds academic degrees in mathematics and economics.

In 2009 the Mexican government created the Raúl Rojas González Prize for scientific achievement by Mexican citizens. The first recipient of the prize was Luis Rafael Herrera Estrella, for contributions to plant biotechnology.

He ran for president at the Free University of Berlin in 2010.

In 2015, he joined the University of Nevada, Reno, College of Science. In addition, he is senior professor at the German University of Digital Science.

== History ==
Rojas was born on June 25, 1955, in Mexico City to an engineer and a teacher. He attended university at the National Polytechnic Institute in Mexico City, where he majored in Mathematics and Physics. He moved to Germany in 1982 as a doctoral student in economics under the guidance of the political economist Elmar Altvater. The resulting dissertation was published under the title "Die Armut der Nationen – Handbuch zur Schuldenkrise von Argentinien bis Zaire" (The poverty of nations – Handbook of debt crisis from Argentina to Zaire). He became a full professor at University of Halle-Wittenberg in 1994, and later moved to the Free University of Berlin, where he remains today in the Informatics department. His wife, Margarita Esponda Argüero, is a professor in the same department.

== Prizes ==
- 2001: Gründerpreis Multimedia of the German Ministry of Finance and Technology
- 2002: European Academic Software Award
- 2004 and 2005: World champions in football robots with the FU-Fighters
- 2005: Wolfgang von Kempelen Prize for the History of Informatics
- 2009: Received the Heberto Castillo gold medal for contributions to science from the Mexico City government
- 2015: Was named Professor of the year by the Association of German Universities
- 2015: Received the National Prize of Sciences and Arts by the Mexican Government in the category of Technology and Design

== Works ==
- Rojas, Raúl (1996). Neural Networks. Berlin, Heidelberg: Springer Berlin Heidelberg. doi:10.1007/978-3-642-61068-4. ISBN 978-3-540-60505-8. S2CID 40019197. Available as a free e-book
- Rojas, Raúl, ed. (1998). Die Rechenmaschinen von Konrad Zuse. Berlin, Heidelberg: Springer Berlin Heidelberg. doi:10.1007/978-3-642-71944-8. ISBN 978-3-642-71945-5.
- Rojas, Raúl (2023). Konrad Zuse's Early Computers. Switzerland: Springer Nature. doi:10.1007/978-3-319-74718-7. ISBN 3031398750.
- Rojas, Raúl (2001). Encyclopedia of Computers and Computer History. Routledge. ISBN 978-1-57958-235-7.
- Rojas, Raul; Hashagen, Ulf (26 July 2002). The First Computers. MIT Press. ISBN 978-0-262-68137-7.
- "RoboCup 2002: Robot Soccer World Cup VI". Lecture Notes in Computer Science. Vol. 2752. Berlin, Heidelberg: Springer Berlin Heidelberg. 2003. doi:10.1007/b11927. ISBN 978-3-540-40666-2. ISSN 0302-9743. S2CID 6657080.
- Rojas, Raúl, The Language of Mathematics: The Stories behind the Symbols, Princeton University Press, 2025.
