= Z11 (computer) =

German 1950s computer

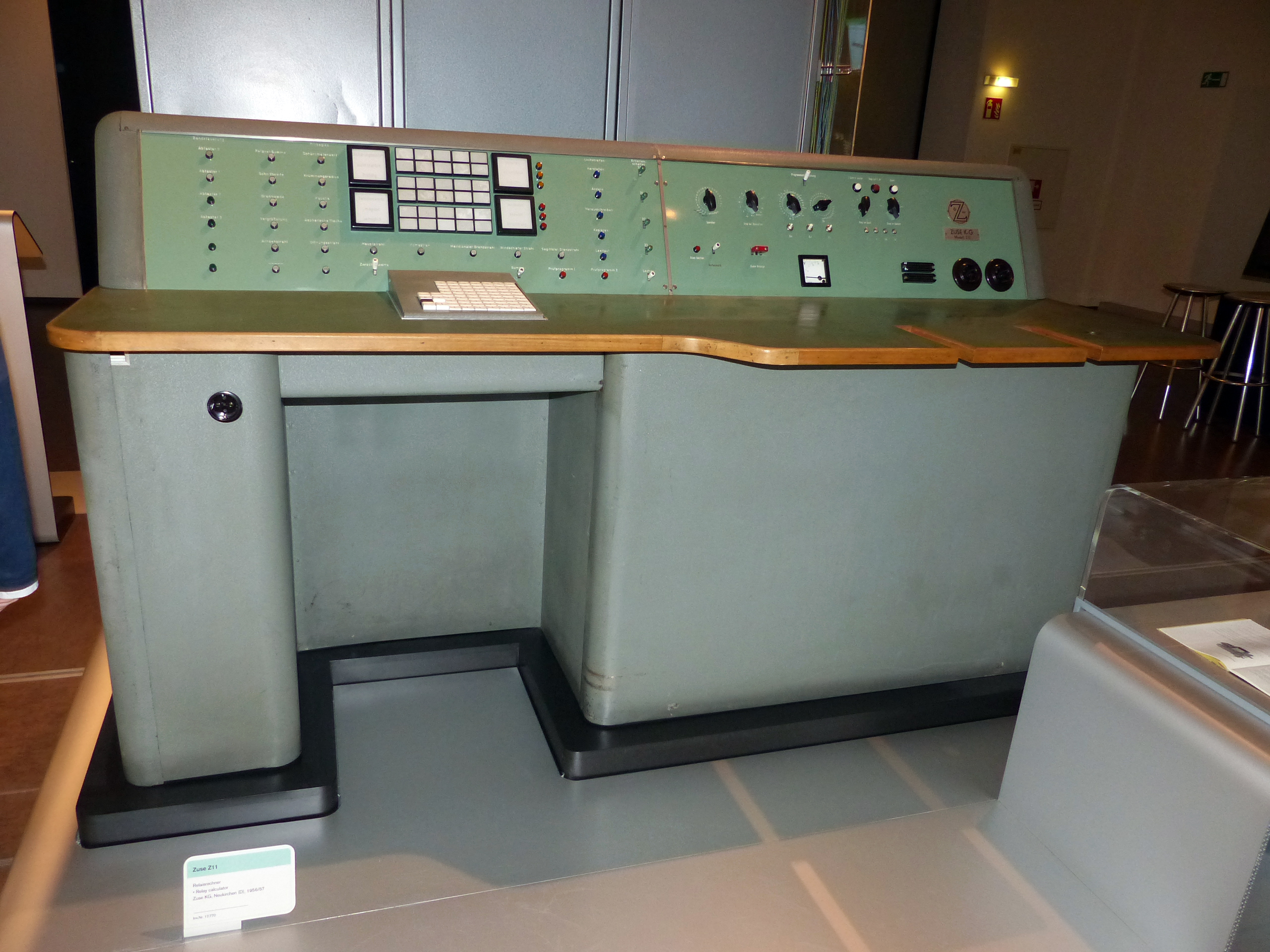
- Z11 in the Technical Museum in Vienna
- Developer: Konrad Zuse
- Manufacturer: Zuse KG
- Released: 1955; 71 years ago
- Introductory price: DM 120,000 (equivalent to DM 320,566 in 2021)
- Units sold: 48
- CPU: @ 10 to 20 Hz
- Memory: Relays, ca. 20 numbers
- Power: 2 kW
- Weight: 800 kg (1,800 lb)
- Successor: Z22

The Z11 was a computer, the first serially produced machine of the Zuse KG.

Weighing 800 kg (1,800 lb), in 1955 it was built with relays and stepwise relays. Beginning in 1957, the Z11 could be programmed by punched tapes. It consumed 2 kW of electricity, and operated mechanically at a frequency of 10 to 20 Hz. Both input and output were in decimal numbers, and it used floating-point arithmetic.

The Z11 was first presented on the Hannover Messe in 1957. Today the German Museum of Technology and the Museum of Technology in Vienna exhibit one of the surviving Z11s.

== History ==
Development of the Z11 began in 1954 at Zuse KG under the direction of Konrad Zuse. The machine was developed primarily to meet the growing demand for large-scale surveying and land-consolidation calculations in post-war Germany. These calculations were required as part of agricultural land reform programmes that sought to reorganise fragmented farmland into more efficient plots. The Z11 was designed specifically for such work and was based on specialised relay-computing techniques previously developed by Zuse and his collaborators.

Unlike later general-purpose computers, early Z11 systems used hardware-programmed calculation procedures implemented through stepwise relays. From 1957 onward, the machine became freely programmable through punched tape, significantly increasing its flexibility and range of applications.

One of the earliest documented installations was delivered to the Carl Zeiss optical works in 1956. The computer was subsequently adopted by organisations involved in surveying, scientific calculation, optical engineering and insurance processing. A total of 48 machines were sold, making the Z11 the first serially produced computer manufactured by Zuse KG and one of the most commercially successful relay computers built in Germany during the 1950s.

Revenue generated from Z11 sales provided an important financial foundation for the development of its electronic successor, the Z22.

== Technical data ==
The typical configuration of a Z11 consisted of:

- Approximately 654 electromechanical relays and 28 stepwise relays
- Relay-based memory capable of storing approximately 20 numbers
- 27-bit floating-point word format including mantissa and exponent
- Decimal input and output facilities
- Hardware-programmed calculation sequences implemented through stepwise relays (1955–1956 models)
- Punched-tape programming system (from 1957 onward)
- Floating-point arithmetic unit
- Mechanical operating frequency of 10–20 Hz
- Power consumption of approximately 2 kW
- Weight of approximately 800 kg

The Z11 used binary internal arithmetic while presenting decimal input and output to the operator. Early machines were programmed via fixed wiring and stepwise relay sequences designed for specific computational tasks, particularly land consolidation calculations. From 1957, punched-tape readers enabled the machine to be freely programmed for a wider range of applications.

Applications of the Z11 included agricultural land consolidation, surveying, optical engineering and insurance calculations.

== Architecture and design ==
The Z11 was an electromechanical computer built using approximately 654 relays and 28 stepwise relays. It employed floating-point arithmetic with a 27-bit word length consisting of a mantissa and exponent. Internal memory could store approximately twenty numbers.

The machine operated mechanically at a frequency of between 10 and 20 hertz and consumed approximately 2 kilowatts of electrical power. Input and output were performed using decimal numbers. Beginning in 1957, programs could be supplied via punched tape, although earlier systems relied on fixed hardware configurations for specific computational tasks.

The Z11 weighed approximately 800 kilograms and was sold for around 120,000 Deutsche Marks. Its applications included agricultural land consolidation, optical engineering and commercial calculations.

== Legacy ==
The Z11 occupies an important position in the history of German computing as the first computer produced in series by Zuse KG. While earlier Zuse machines, such as the Z3 and Z4, were pioneering technical achievements, the Z11 demonstrated that computers could be manufactured and sold successfully to commercial and scientific customers.

The machine helped establish Zuse KG as one of Europe's earliest computer manufacturers and provided the financial resources necessary to develop later electronic systems, including the Z22. Several Z11 computers survive in museum collections, including examples preserved at the Technical Museum Vienna and the German Museum of Technology in Berlin.

The success of the Z11 also reflected the growing demand for automated calculation in post-war Europe, particularly in surveying, engineering and scientific research.
