= Timeline of women in computing =

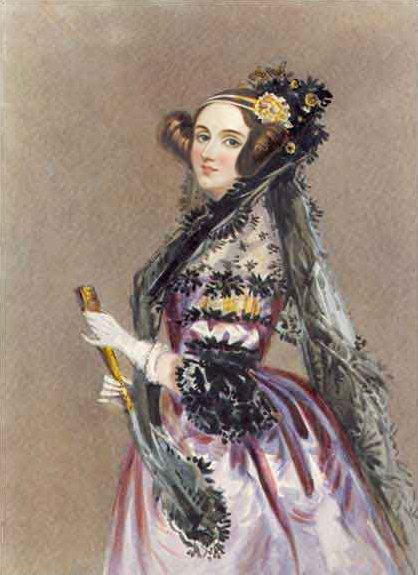
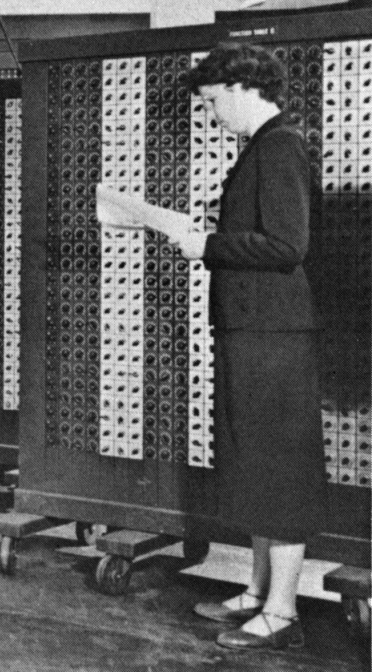

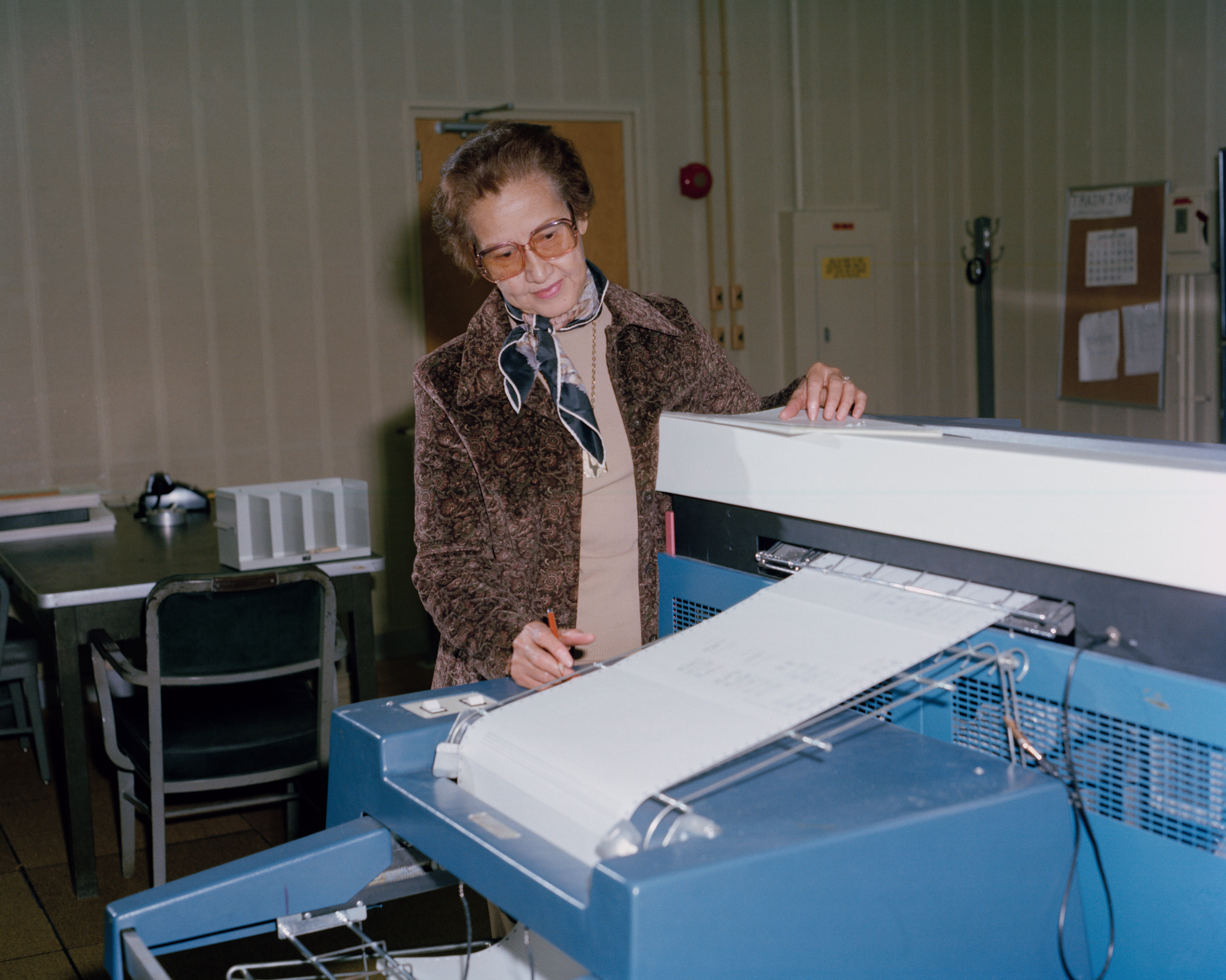
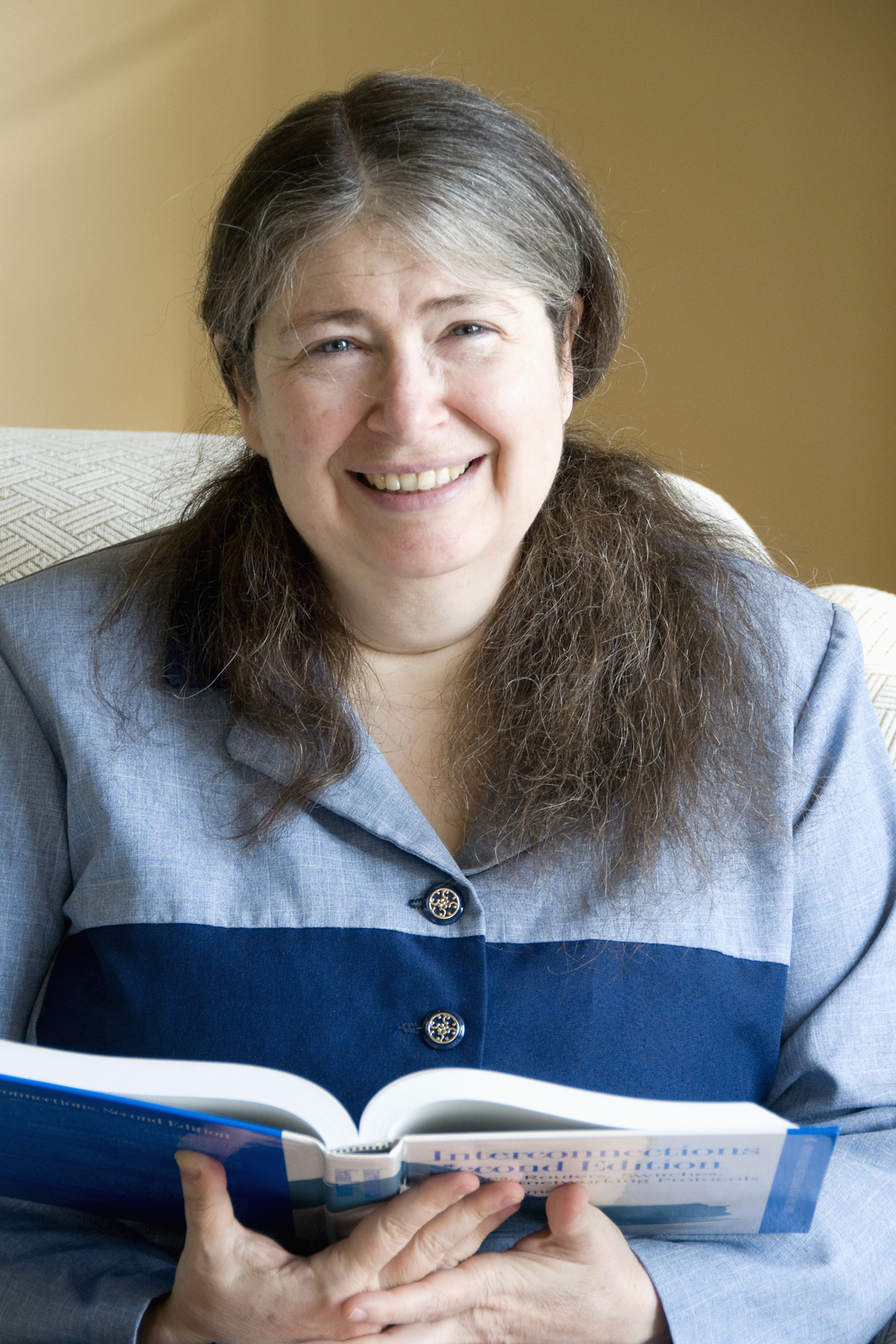
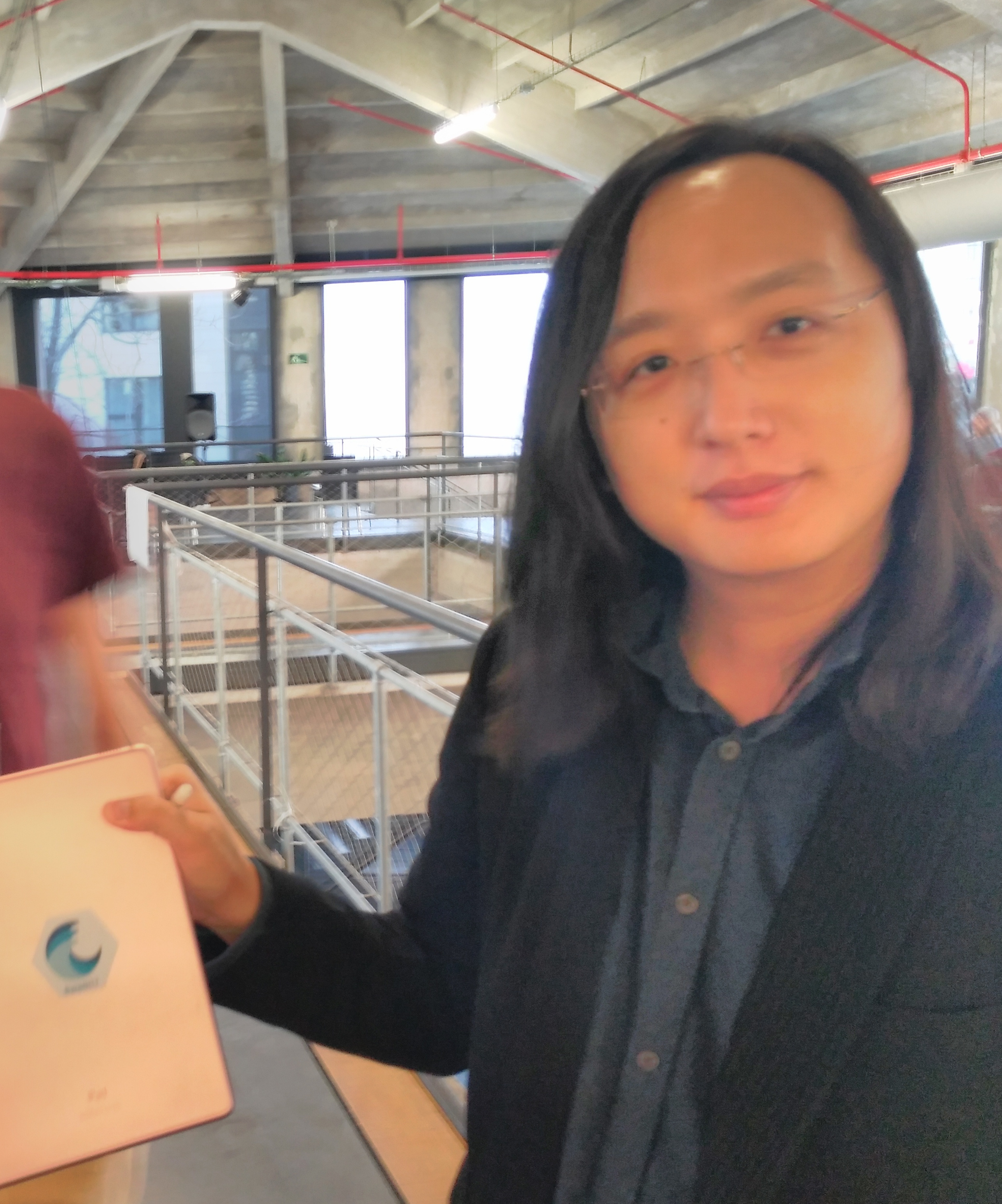
Women pioneers in computing. Clockwise from top left: Ada Lovelace, Betty Holberton, Radia Perlman, Audrey Tang, Gladys West, Katherine Johnson.

This is a timeline of women in computing. It covers the time when women worked as "human computers" and then as programmers of physical computers. Eventually, women programmers went on to write software, develop Internet technologies and other types of programming. Women have also been involved in computer science, various related types of engineering and computer hardware.

== 18th century ==
=== 1757 ===
- (France) Nicole-Reine Etable de la Brière Lepaute worked on a team of human computers to determine the next visit of Halley's Comet. The methods they developed have been used by successive human computing teams.

== 19th century ==
=== 1842 ===
- (United Kingdom) Ada Lovelace was an analyst of Charles Babbage's analytical engine and is considered by many the "first computer programmer".

=== 1849 ===
- (United States) Maria Mitchell is hired by the U.S. Nautical Almanac Office to work as a computer on tables for the planet Venus.

=== 1875 ===
- (United States) Anna Winlock joined the Harvard computers, a group of women engaged in the production of astronomical data at Harvard.

=== 1893 ===
- (United States) Henrietta Swan Leavitt joined the Harvard "computers". She was instrumental in discovery of the cepheid variable stars, which are evidence for the expansion of the universe.

== 20th century ==
=== 1916 ===
- (United Kingdom) Beatrice Cave-Brown-Cave went to work as a human computer for the Ministry of Munitions.

=== 1918 ===
- (United States) Women were hired to do ballistics calculations as human computers in Washington, D.C. The "chief computer" of the group was Elizabeth Webb Wilson.

=== 1920 ===
- (United States) Mary Clem leads the computing lab at Iowa State College.

=== 1921 ===
- (United States) Edith Clarke files a patent for a graphical calculator for problem solving electric power-line transmission problems.

=== 1926 ===
- (Germany) Grete Hermann published the foundational paper for computerized algebra. It was her doctoral thesis, titled "The Question of Finitely Many Steps in Polynomial Ideal Theory", and published in Mathematische Annalen.

=== 1935 ===
- (United States) The National Advisory Committee for Aeronautics (NACA) which became NASA, hired a group of five women to work in their computer pool analyzing data from wind tunnels and flight tests.

=== 1939 ===
- (Austria) The Austrian Johanna Piesch published two pioneering papers on switching algebra.

=== 1940 ===
- (United States) American women were recruited to do ballistics calculations and program computers during WWII. Around 1943–1945, these women "computers" used a differential analyzer in the basement of the Moore School of Electrical Engineering to speed up their calculations, though the machine required a mechanic to be totally accurate and the women often rechecked the calculations by hand. Phyllis Fox ran a differential analyzer single-handedly, with differential equations as her program specification.

=== 1941 ===
- (United Kingdom) Mavis Batey broke the Italian Naval code while working at Bletchley Park.
- The United States begins recruiting African-American college graduates to work at Langley Air Force Base as human computers.

=== 1942 ===
- (United States) On 11 August, Hedy Lamarr and co-inventor, George Antheil, received their patent for frequency hopping.

=== 1943 ===
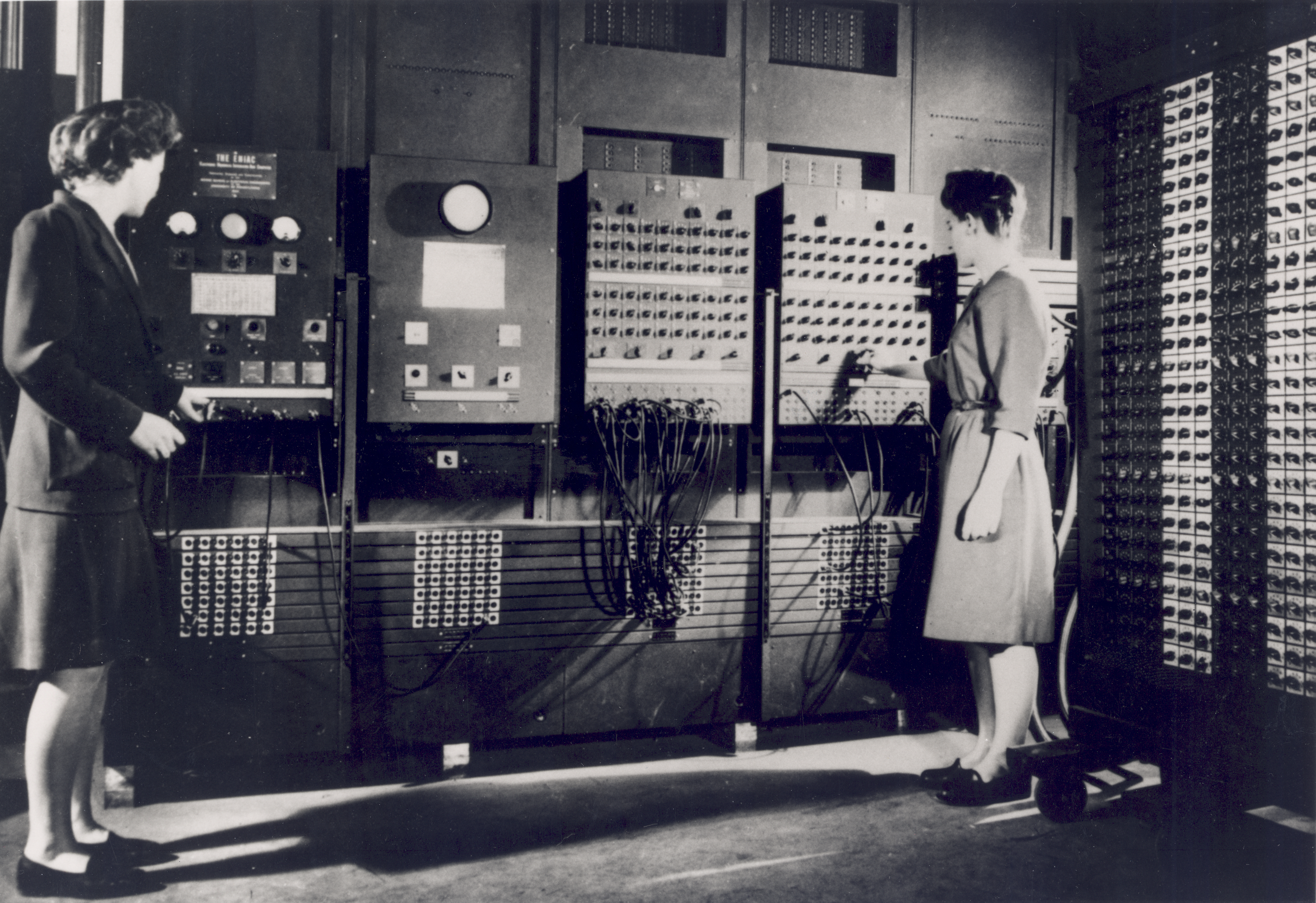
Jean Bartik and Frances Spence setting up the ENIAC

- (United Kingdom) Women worked as WREN Colossus operators during WW2 at Bletchley Park.
- (United States) Wives of scientists working on the Manhattan Project with mathematical training were hired as human computers to work on the ENIAC and MANIAC I computers. This included Klara Dan von Neumann, Augusta H. Teller, and Adele Goldstine.
- (United States) Gertrude Blanch led the Mathematical Tables Project group from 1938 to 1948. During World War II, the project operated as a major computing office for the U.S. government and did calculations for the Office of Scientific Research and Development, the Army, the Navy, the Manhattan Project and other institutions.
- (United States) Ruth Leach Amonette was elected vice president at IBM, the first woman to hold that role.

=== 1945 ===
- (United States) Marlyn Meltzer is hired as one of the first ENIAC programmers.
- (Republic of Ireland) Kay McNulty Mauchly Antonelli is hired as one of the ENIAC programmers and is accredited with creating the first 'subroutine'.

=== 1946 ===
- (United States) Betty Jennings, Betty Snyder, Frances Spence, Kay McNulty, Marlyn Wescoff, and Ruth Lichterman were the regularly working programmers of the ENIAC. Adele Goldstine, also involved in the programming, wrote the program manual for the ENIAC.

=== 1947 ===
- (United States) Irma Wyman worked on a missile guidance project at the Willow Run Research Center. To calculate trajectory, they used mechanical calculators. In 1947–48, she visited the U.S. Naval Proving Ground where Grace Hopper was working on similar problems and discovered they were using a prototype of a programmable Mark II computer.

=== 1948 ===
- (United Kingdom) Kathleen Booth is credited with writing the assembly language for the ARC2 computer.
- (United States) Dorothy Vaughn becomes the first black supervisor at NACA.

=== 1949 ===
- Grace Hopper, was a United States Navy officer and one of the first programmers of the Harvard Mark I, known as the "Mother of COBOL". She developed the first compiler for an electronic computer, known as A-0. She also popularized the term "debugging" – a reference to a moth extracted from a relay in the Harvard Mark II computer.
- (United States) Evelyn Boyd Granville was the second African-American woman in the U.S. to receive a PhD in mathematics. From 1956 to 1960, she worked for IBM on the Project Vanguard and Project Mercury space programs, analyzing orbits and developing computer procedures.
- (Canada) On 6 May, the EDSAC performs its first calculations using a program written by Beatrice Worsely.

=== 1950 ===
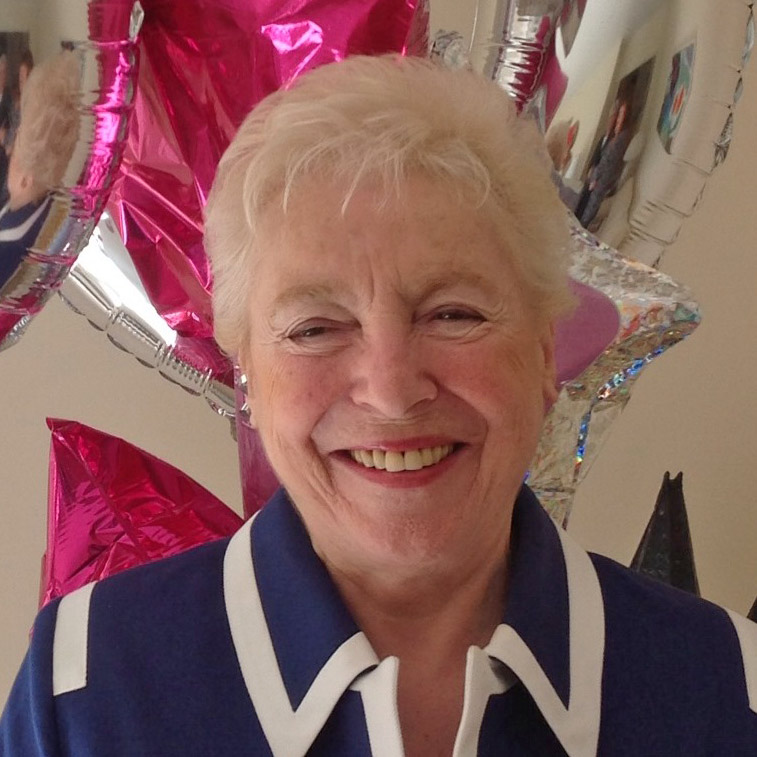
Dame Stephanie "Steve" Shirley

- (United States) Ida Rhodes was one of the pioneers in the analysis of systems of programming. She co-designed the C-10 language in the early 1950s for the UNIVAC I – a computer system that was used to calculate the census.
- (United Kingdom) Kathleen Booth creates Assembly Language.

=== 1951 ===
- (United States) Frances Elizabeth "Betty" Snyder develops a UNIVAC program, the first sort-merge generator.

=== 1952 ===
- (United Kingdom) Mary Coombs was one of the first programmers on, and was the first female programmer on LEO, the first business computer. She went on to work on LEO II and LEO III.
- (Hungary) Hungarian-born Klara Dan von Neumann pioneers the programming of MANIAC I.
- (Canada) Canadian, Beatrice Worsley, completes her doctorate in computer science, becoming the first woman to earn that degree.

=== 1954 ===
- (United States) Thelma Estrin works on Israel's first computer, the WEIZAC.

=== 1955 ===
- (United States) Annie Easley starts working as a human computer for NACA.
- (Ukraine) (Soviet Union) Kateryna Yushchenko creates Address (programming language) that made possible indirect addressing and addresses of the highest rank – analogous to pointers.
- (United States) Mary Tsingou runs code on MANIAC I to describe interacting waves on a string. The famous Fermi-Pasta-Ulam-Tsingou problem revealed a paradox in nonlinear dynamics, and the value of computer simulation in analyzing complex systems. The FPUT work stimulated the emerging field of nonlinear computational science that relies on computers to carry out numerical experiments.

=== 1958 ===
- Orbital calculations for the United States' Explorer 1 satellite were solved by the NASA Jet Propulsion Laboratory's all-female "computers", many of whom were recruited out of high school. Mechanical calculators were supplemented with logarithmic calculations performed by hand.
- (United States) Grace Hopper designs the computer language, FLOWMATIC.
- (United States) 5 May, Langley desegregates, closing down the West Area Computers.
- (United Kingdom) Kathleen Booth publishes a book about programming APE(X)C computers.

=== 1959 ===
- (United States) Mary K. Hawes convenes a meeting to discuss specifications for a business programming language. This would lead to the creation of COBOL.

=== 1961 ===
- (United States) Dana Ulery was the first female engineer at Jet Propulsion Laboratory, developing real-time tracking systems using a North American Aviation Recomp II, a 40-bit word size computer.

=== 1962 ===
- (United States) Jean E. Sammet developed the FORMAC programming language. She was also the first to write extensively about the history and categorization of programming languages in 1969, and became the first female president of the Association for Computing Machinery in 1974.
- (United Kingdom) Dame Stephanie "Steve" Shirley founded the UK software company F.I. She was concerned with creating work opportunities for women with dependents, and predominantly employed women, only 3 out of 300-odd programmers were male, until that became illegal. She adopted the name "Steve" to help her in the male-dominated business world. From 1989 to 1990, she was president of the British Computer Society. In 1985, she was awarded a Recognition of Information Technology Award.

=== 1964 ===
- (United Kingdom) Joan Ball was the first person to start a computer dating service in 1964.
- (United States) Sharla Boehm performed pioneering work in packet switching.

=== 1965 ===
- (United States) Mary Allen Wilkes was the first person to use a computer in a private home (in 1965) and the first developer of an operating system (LAP) for the first minicomputer (LINC).
- (United States) Sister Mary Kenneth Keller became the first American woman to earn a Ph.D. in Computer Science in 1965. Her thesis was titled "Inductive Inference on Computer Generated Patterns".

=== 1966 ===
- (United States) Margaret R. Fox was appointed Chief of the Office of Computer Information in 1966, part of the Institute for Computer Science and Technology of NBS. She held the post until 1975. She was also actively involved in the Association for Computing Machinery (ACM) and served as the first Secretary for the American Federation of Information Processing Societies (AFIPS).

=== 1968 ===
- (France) Vera Molnár is one of the pioneers of computer and algorithmic arts. In 1968 she began working with computers, where she began to create algorithmic drawings based on simple geometric shapes geometrical themes.

=== 1969 ===
- (United States) Jean E. Sammet publishes Programming Languages: History and Fundamentals, which was the standard in the field at the time.
- (United States) Margaret Hamilton was, in the late 1960s, Director of the Software Engineering Division of the MIT Instrumentation Laboratory, which developed on-board flight software for the Apollo space program. MIT work prevented an abort of the Apollo 11 Moon landing by using robust architecture. Later, she was awarded the NASA Exceptional Space Act Award for her scientific and technical contributions.
- (United States) Alexandra Illmer Forsythe is a co-author of the first computer science textbook, Computer Science: A First Course (Wiley & Sons).

=== 1970 ===
- (Norway) Drude Berntsen is appointed director of the Norwegian Computing Center.

=== 1971 ===
- (United States) Erna Schneider Hoover is an American mathematician notable for inventing a computerized telephone switching method which developed modern communication according to several reports. At Bell Laboratories, where she worked for over 32 years, Hoover was described as an important pioneer for women in the field of computer technology.
- (United States) Margaret Burnett became the first woman software developer ever hired by Procter & Gamble/Ivorydale, a 13,000-employee complex that included their R&D center. Her position as a software developer also made her the first woman ever hired into a management-level position there.

=== 1972 ===
- (United States) Mary Shaw became the first woman to earn a Ph.D. in computer science from Carnegie Mellon University.
- (United States) Adele Goldberg was one of developers of the Smalltalk language.
- (United Kingdom) Karen Spärck Jones was one of the pioneers of information retrieval and natural language processing.
- (United States) Sandra Kurtzig founded ASK Computer Systems, an early Silicon Valley startup, on a $20,000 budget.

=== 1973 ===
- (United States) Susan Nycum co-authored Computer Abuse, a minor classic that was one of the first studies to define and document computer-related crime.
- (United States) Phyllis Fox worked on the PORT portable mathematical/numerical library.

=== 1974 ===
- (United States) Elizabeth Feinler and her team defined a simple text file format for Internet host names. The list evolved into the Domain Name System and her group became the naming authority for the top-level domains of .mil, .gov, .edu, .org, and .com.

=== 1975 ===
- (United States) Irene Greif became the first woman to earn a Ph.D. in computer science from the Massachusetts Institute of Technology.
- (India) Indian computer scientist Sudha Murthy is hired as first woman to work for TELCO as an engineer.
- (United States) Charity Cheiky co-founds the pioneering microcomputer systems manufacturer Ohio Scientific Instruments, with her husband Michael and business partner Dale Dreisbach.

=== 1976 ===
- (Hungary) Rózsa Péter publishes Recursive Functions in Computer Theory, a topic she had been working on since the 1950s.

=== 1978 ===
- (United Kingdom) Sophie Wilson is a British computer scientist. She is known for designing the Acorn Micro-Computer, as well as the instruction set of the ARM processor.
- The Association for Women in Computing (AWC) is founded.
- (Austria) Christiane Floyd becomes the first woman to work as a computer science professor in Germany.

=== 1979 ===
- (United States) Lynn Conway co-authored Introduction to VLSI Systems, a bestselling very-large-scale integration (VLSI) design textbook that triggered the Mead and Conway revolution in integrated circuit design.
- (United States) Patricia Selinger was one of the key architects of IBM System R, and in 1979 wrote the canonical paper on relational query optimization. She was appointed an IBM Fellow in 1994, and an ACM Fellow in 2009.
- (United States) Carol Shaw was a game designer and programmer for Atari Corp. and Activision.
- (United States) Ruzena Bajcsy founds the General Robotics, Automation, Sensing and Perception (GRASP) lab at the University of Pennsylvania.
- (India) Priti Shankar does work with generalizing the Bose Chaudhuri-Hocquenghem (BHC) codes for error-correcting.

=== 1980 ===
- (United States) Carla Meninsky was the game designer and programmer for Atari 2600 games Star Raiders and Warlords.
- (United States) Gwen Bell starts the Computer Museum to preserve artifacts of computer history.
- (United States) Ruth M. Davis founds Pymatuning Group in Virginia.

=== 1982 ===
- (United States) Lorinda Cherry worked on the Writer's Workbench (wwb) for Bell Labs.
- (United States) Marsha R. Williams becomes the first African American woman to earn a Ph.D. in computer science.

=== 1983 ===
- (United States) Janese Swanson (with others) developed the first of the Carmen Sandiego games. She went on to found Girl Tech. Girl Tech develops products and services that encourage girls to use new technologies, such as the Internet and video games.

=== 1984 ===
- (United States) Roberta Williams did pioneering work in graphical adventure games for personal computers, particularly the King's Quest series.
- (United States) Susan Kare created the icons and many of the interface elements for the original Apple Macintosh in the 1980s, and was an original employee of NeXT, working as the Creative Director.
- Eleanor K. Baum becomes the first woman in the United States to be named dean of an engineering college.

=== 1985 ===
- (United States) Radia Perlman invented the Spanning Tree Protocol. She has done extensive and innovative research, particularly on encryption and networking. She received the USENIX Lifetime Achievement Award in 2006.
- (United States) Irma Wyman was the first Honeywell CIO.
- Janet Walker develops the Symbolics Document Examiner.

=== 1986 ===
- (United States) Lixia Zhang was the only woman at the initial meetings of the Internet Engineering Task Force.
- (South Africa) Nancy Hafkin heads the Pan African Development Information System.

=== 1987 ===
- (United States) Monica S. Lam receives a Ph.D. for her work on optimising compilers. She has since then performed influential research in many areas of computer science as well as co-authored a famous textbook on compilers.
- (United States) Anita Borg founds the electronic mailing list for women in technology, Systers.
- (France) French computer scientist, Joëlle Coutaz develops the Presentation-abstraction-control model for human computer interactions.

=== 1988 ===
- (Hungary) Éva Tardos, is the recipient of the Fulkerson Prize for her research on design and analysis of algorithms.
- (United States) Janie Tsao co-founds Linksys.

=== 1989 ===
- (United States) Frances E. Allen became the first female IBM Fellow in 1989. In 2006, she became the first female recipient of the ACM's Turing Award.
- Frances Brazier, professor of Computer Science at the Vrije Universiteit in Amsterdam, is one of the founder of NLnet, the first Internet service provider in the Netherlands.

=== 1990 ===
- (United States) Ruzena Bajcsy becomes the first woman to chair the computer and information science department at the University of Pennsylvania.

=== 1992 ===
- (United States) Donna Dubinsky CEO and co-founder of Palm, Inc., co-founder of Handspring, co-founder of Numenta, Harvard Business School's Alumni Achievement Award winner for "introducing the first successful personal digital assistant (PDA) and who is now developing a computer memory system modeled after the human brain".
- (United States) Nancy Rhine and Ellen Pack co-found the first online space targeting women, Women's WIRE.
- (United States) Carol Bartz becomes the CEO of Autodesk.

=== 1993 ===
- (United States) Shafi Goldwasser, a theoretical computer scientist, is a two-time recipient of the Gödel Prize for research on complexity theory, cryptography and computational number theory, and the invention of zero-knowledge proofs.
- (United States) Barbara Liskov together with Jeannette Wing, developed the Liskov substitution principle. Liskov was also the winner of the Turing Prize in 2008.
- (United States) Carolyn Guyer writes feminist hypertext, Quibbling.

=== 1994 ===
- (United States) Sally Floyd, is known for her work on Transmission Control Protocol.
- The Grace Hopper Celebration of Women in Computing is first launched by Anita Borg.
- Hi-Pitched Voices, a collaborative hypertext women's writing project is launched in the Hypertext Hotel.
- On 20 April, Hu Qiheng lead the project that installed the first TCP/IP connection to the Internet in China.

=== 1995 ===
- (United States) Mary Lou Jepsen is the CTO of MicroDisplay where she developed smaller computer screens.
- (United States) Eleanor K. Baum is the first woman to be elected president of the American Society for Engineering Education.

=== 1996 ===
- (United States) Xiaoyuan Tu was the first female recipient of ACM's Doctoral Dissertation Award.

=== 1997 ===
- (United States) Anita Borg, was the founding director of the Institute for Women and Technology (IWT), renamed Anita Borg Institute (ABI) in her honor in 2003.
- (Japan) Japanese-born Chieko Asakawa develops the IBM Home Page Reader opening up Web resources to the blind.
- (Russia) Natalya Kaspersky co-founds and heads the highly successful antivirus software company Kaspersky Lab.
- (United States) (Portugal) Manuela Veloso is awarded the CMU Allen Newell Medal for Excellence in Research.

=== 1998 ===
- The Center for Women and Information Technology (CWIT) is established at the University of Maryland, Baltimore County (UMBC).
- (United States) Meg Whitman becomes the CEO of eBay.

=== 1999 ===
- LinuxChix, an international organization for women who use Linux and women and men who want to support women in computing, was founded by Deb Richardson.
- (United States) Marissa Mayer, was the first female engineer hired at Google, and was later named vice president of Search Product and User Experience. She was formerly the CEO of Yahoo!.
- (China) Lixia Zhang coined the term, "middlebox".
- (United States) Carly Fiorina starts as the CEO of Hewlett-Packard.
- (China) Sun Yafeng starts as the chair of Huawei Technologies Board.

== 21st century ==
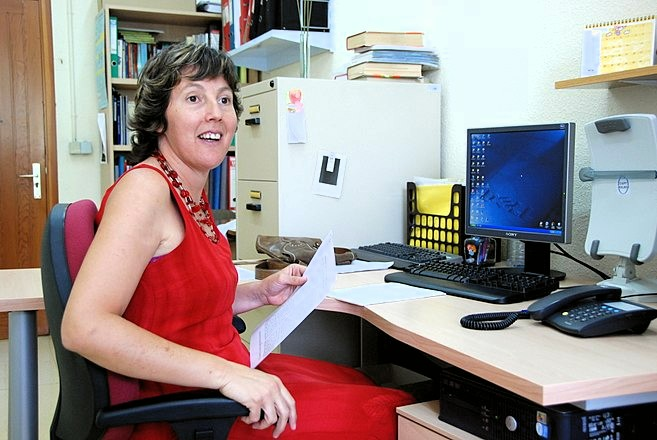
Computer scientist Montse Maritxalar of the University of the Basque Country in 2008

=== 2000 ===
- (Greece) Lydia Kavraki is awarded the Grace Murray Hopper Award.

=== 2001 ===
- (Japan) Noriko H. Arai started developing NetCommons which is used for content management at over 3,500 educational institutions.

=== 2003 ===
- (United States) Ellen Spertus earned a PhD in Electrical Engineering and Computer Science from MIT in 1998 with the notable thesis "ParaSite: Mining the structural information on the World-Wide Web".
- (United States) Margaret Hamilton received the NASA Exceptional Space Act Award.
- (United Kingdom) Sue Black starts her campaign to preserve Bletchley Park.

=== 2004 ===
- (United States) Jeri Ellsworth is a self-taught computer chip designer and creator of the C64 Direct-to-TV.
- (United States) Lucy Sanders co-founded the National Center for Women & Information Technology
- (United States) (Israel) Safra Catz becomes the President of Oracle Corporation.

=== 2005 ===
- (Taiwan) Audrey Tang founds and leads Pugs project, the first Perl 6 (now Raku) compiler–interpreter.
- (United States) Mary Lou Jepsen is the founder and chief technology officer of One Laptop Per Child (OLPC), and the founder of Pixel Qi.
- (India) Facebook hires their first woman engineer, Ruchi Sanghvi.
- (China) Xiaoyun Wang and her team crack the SHA-1 data security algorithm.

=== 2006 ===
- (United States) (Canada) Maria Klawe is the first woman to become president of the Harvey Mudd College since its founding in 1955 and was ACM president from 2002 until 2004.
- (United States) Melanie Rieback's research concerns the security and privacy of Radio Frequency Identification (RFID) technology, she is known to have programmed the first virus to infect RFID devices.
- (Poland) Joanna Rutkowska presented Blue Pill, a rootkit based on x86 virtualization, at the Black Hat Briefings computer security conference.
- (United States) In January, Janet Emerson Bashen, became the first African American woman to hold a patent for a software invention.
- (United States) Frances "Fran" Allen becomes the first woman to earn an A.M. Turing Award.
- (Belgium) Sophie Vandebroek becomes the Chief Technology Officer for Xerox.
- (France) Anne-Marie Kermarrec starts as the Research Director for L'Institut national de recherche en informatique et en automatique (INRIA).
- (Israel) Yoelle Maarek opens the Google Haifa Engineering Center where she is the Director.

=== 2007 ===
- (United States) (Turkey) Meral Özsoyoğlu become the editor-in-chief of the ACM Transactions of Database Systems and is the first woman to hold that position.

=== 2008 ===
- (United States) (Portugal) Portuguese-born Carla Gomes founds and directs Cornell's Institute for Computational Sustainability.
- (United States) Barbara Liskov is the winner of the 2008 A.M. Turing Award.
- (United Kingdom) The British Computer Society Information Retrieval Specialist Group (BCS IRSG) and the British Computer Society (BCS) create an award in the name of computer scientist, Karen Spärck Jones.

=== 2009 ===
- (China) Lixia Zhang is awarded an IEEE Internet Award for her "contributions towards developing the Internet's architecture."
- (United States) Carol Bartz joins Yahoo! as CEO.
- (United Kingdom) Maria Petrou starts as the director of the Informatics and Telematics Institute at Greece's Centre for Research and Technology (CERTH).

=== 2010 ===
- Farida Bedwei co-founds Logiciel in Ghana.

=== 2011 ===
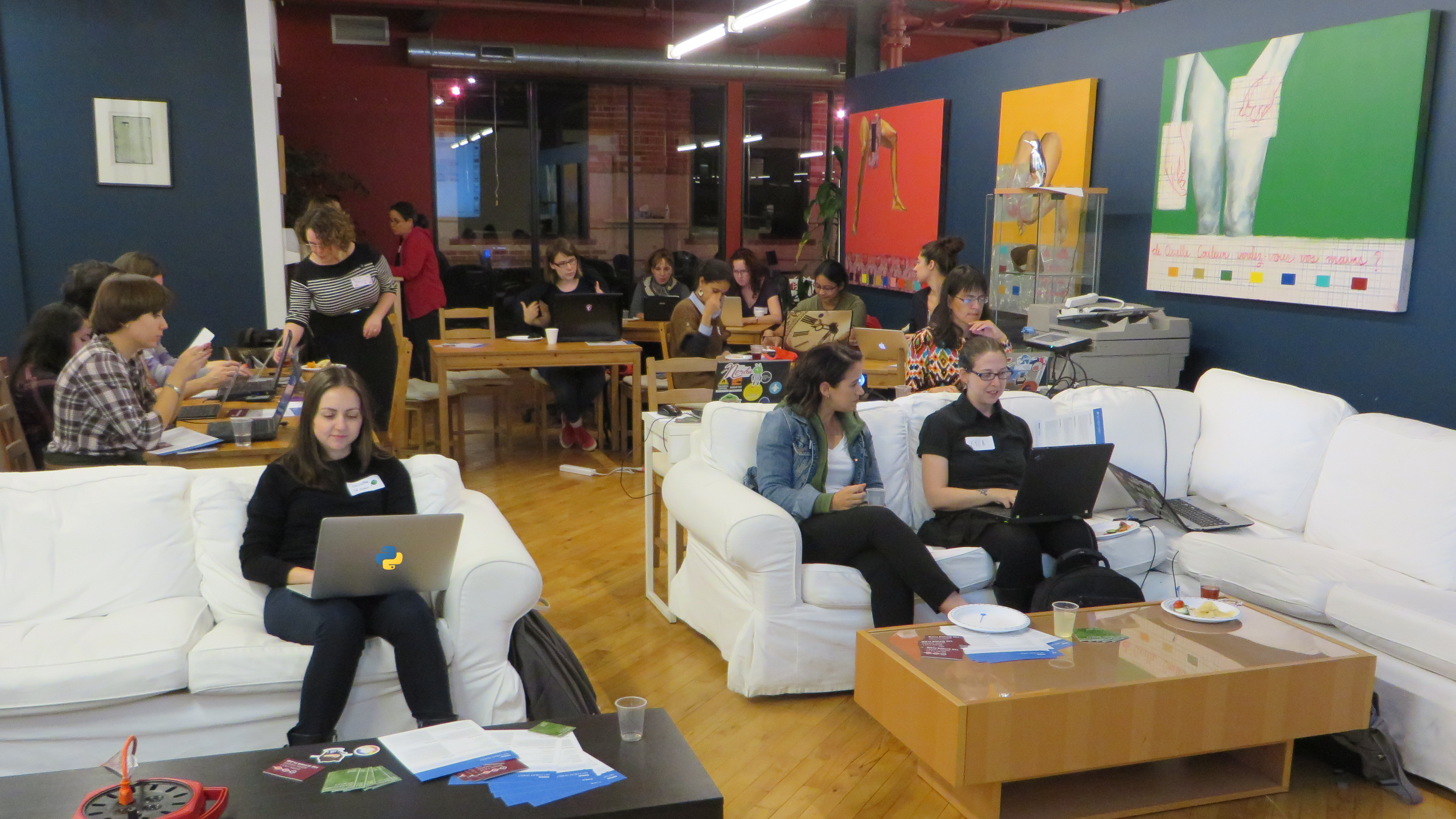
PyLadies of Montreal at a 2015 GitHub party

- PyLadies, an international organization of women interested in coding Python, is started in Los Angeles.
- (United States) Meg Whitman becomes CEO of Hewlett-Packard.
- (Germany) Bettina Speckmann is the first winner of the Netherlands Prize for ICT Research where she was recognized for her work on geographic information systems.
- (Japan) Noriko H. Arai is the Program director for the artificial intelligence challenge: "Can a robot get into the University of Tokyo?"
- (Kenya) Shikoh Gitau is awarded the Google Anita Borg Award, becoming the first person to earn a Google award in Sub Saharan Africa.

=== 2012 ===
- (United States) Shafi Goldwasser is a co-recipient of the A.M. Turing Award.
- Pixelles hosts their first game-programming incubator in Montreal.
- (United Kingdom) Computer scientist, Muffy Calder, starts as the Chief Scientific Advisor for the Scottish Government.
- (United States) Ginni Rometty becomes the first woman to serve as president and CEO of IBM.
- (Hungary) Eva Tardos earns the Gödel Prize.
- (Ghana) Regina Honu founds Soronko Solutions, a software development company in 2012.
- (United States) Carol Reiley is the first woman engineer to be featured on the cover of MAKE magazine.
- Nigerian Women In Information Technology (NiWIIT) was created as an interest group of the Nigeria Computer Society to empower and encourage women working in the field of Information and Communication Technologies.

=== 2013 ===
- (Afghanistan) Time magazine names Afghani software developer, Roya Mahboob, one of the 100 most influential people of the year.
- (France) Christine Paulin-Mohring is awarded the ACM Software System Award for her work on the Rocq (then: Coq) Proof Assistant System.

=== 2014 ===
- Megan Smith named third (and first female) Chief technology officer of the United States of America (USCTO), succeeding Todd Park.
- (United States) Coraline Ada Ehmke drafts the first code of conduct for open source projects, the Contributor Covenant.
- (United States) Perianne Boring founded the trade organization and advocacy group Chamber of Digital Commerce in July.
- In August, the first Pan-African Women in Tech conference took place online.

=== 2015 ===
- (United States) Sarah Sharp is the first winner of the annual Women in Open Source Community Award, awarded by Red Hat.
- Kesha Shah is the first winner of the annual Women in Open Source Academic Award, awarded by Red Hat.
- (United Kingdom) Gillian Docherty becomes the new CEO of the DataLab in Scotland.

=== 2016 ===
- Audrey Tang becomes "digital minister" in Taiwan.
- (United Kingdom) Kate Devlin co-organizes the first "sex-tech hackathon" in the UK.
- (United States) Maja Matarić co-founds Embodied Robotics.

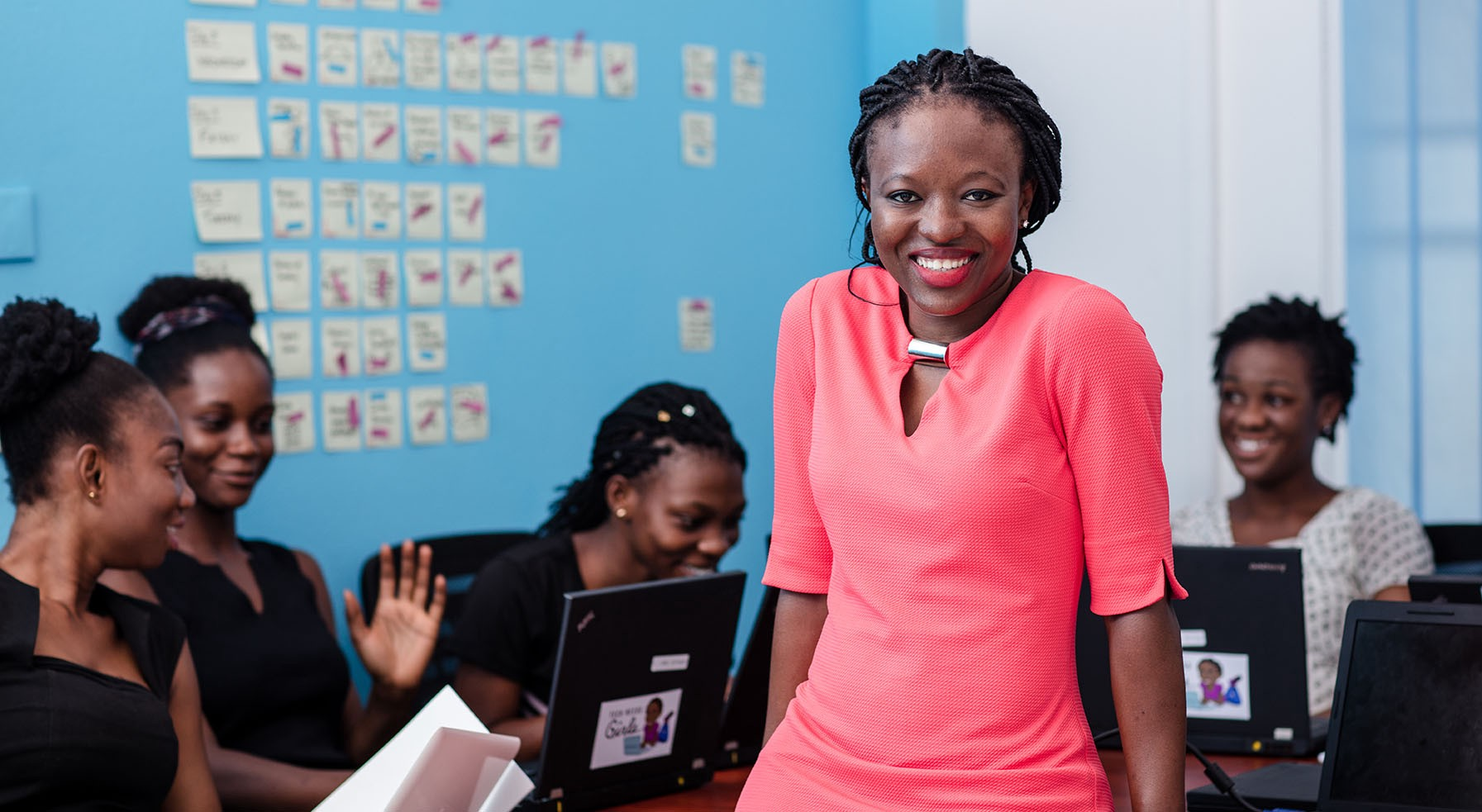
Regina Honu with a classroom of students learning to code

=== 2017 ===
- Michelle Simmons founds the first quantum computer company in Australia.
- (Ghana) Regina Honu opens Soronko Academy, the first coding and "human centered design school" for both children and teens in West Africa.

=== 2018 ===
- (United States) Dame Rosie Stephenson-Goodknight was appointed a Knight of the St. Sava Order of Diplomatic Pacifism for her work on Wikipedia.
- (United States) Gladys West, a human computer whose calculations helped develop GPS technology, is recognized for her work in December when she is inducted into the Air Force Space and Missile Pioneers Hall of Fame.
- (United States) Safiya Umoja Noble publishes Algorithms of Oppression: How Search Engines Reinforce Racism, arguing that search algorithms are racist and perpetuate societal problems.
- (Ghana) - (United States) Joy Buolamwini publishes Gender Shades: Intersectional Accuracy Disparities in Commercial Gender Classification, exposing biases in facial recognition systems.

== See also ==
- Women in computing
- Timeline of women in science
