= Regina Honu =

Ghanaian software developer

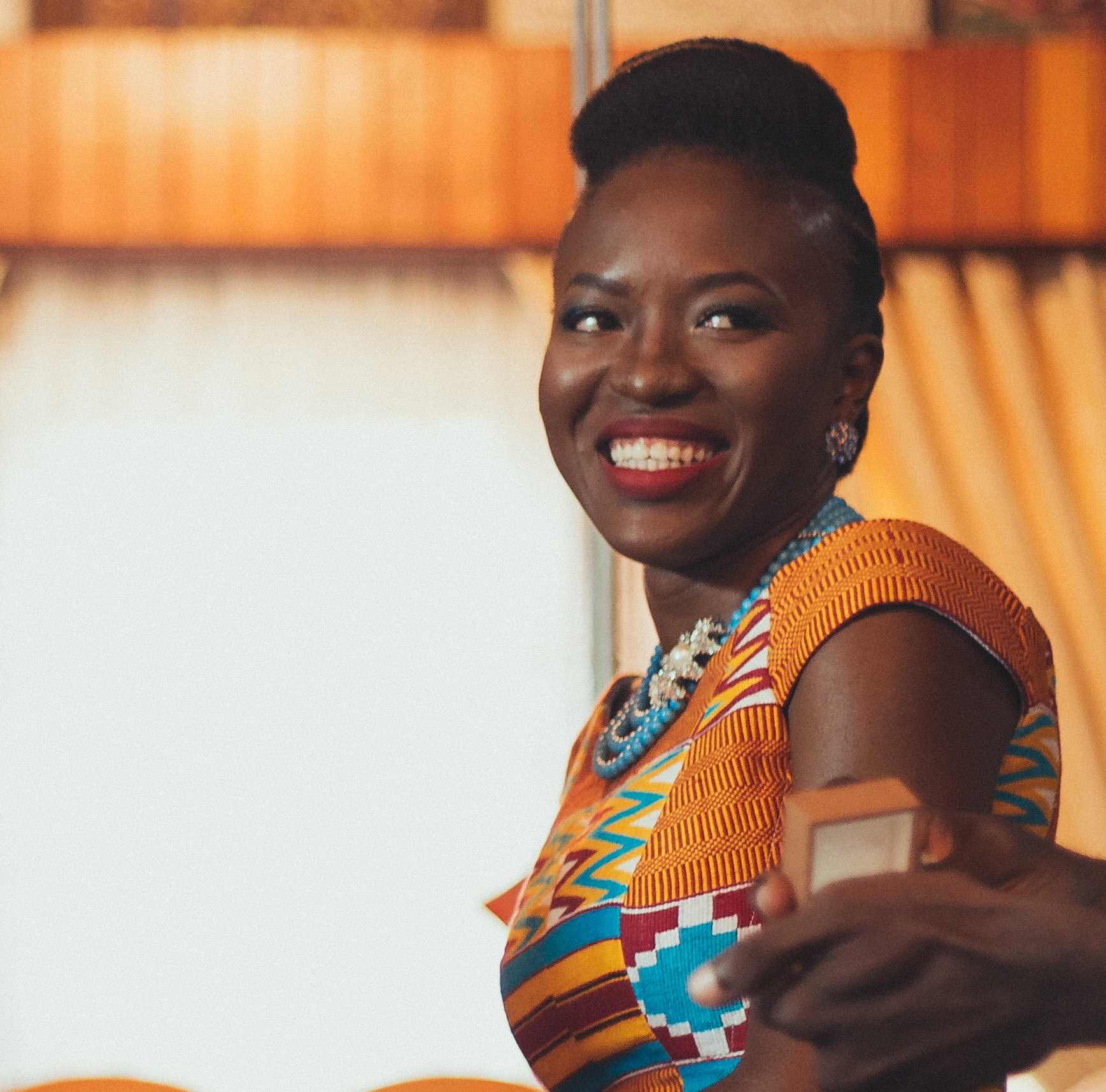
- Born: Regina Fremah Agyare; Accra, Ghana
- Education: Holy Child High School; Ashesi University
- Occupations: Social entrepreneur, software developer
- Years active: 2012–present
- Known for: Founding the Soronko Academy
- Awards: 2017 Buffett Award for Emerging Global Leaders; Women of Courage Award for Technology
- Honours: BBC 100 Women of 2017
- Website: Official website

Regina Honu (née Agyare), is a Ghanaian social entrepreneur, software developer and founder of Soronko Solutions, a software development company in Ghana. She opened Soronko Academy, the first coding and human-centered design school for children and young adults in West Africa. She has also been recognized for her leadership in supporting gender equity and digital tech innovation. Honu has received multiple awards, including being named by CNN as one of the 12 inspirational women who rock STEM. She was also named as one of the six women making an impact in Tech in Africa and one of the ten female entrepreneurs to watch in emerging economies.

She has received attention with features on platforms such as CNN African Voices, BBC, Deutsche Welle, Aljazeera as well as the Impatient Optimist blog by The Bill and Melinda Gates Foundation. In an interview with CNN's African Start-Up, she is described as a Ghanaian tech guru who wants to develop the next generation of women in technology.

Honu's story was also published in Sheryl Sandberg's book Lean In. She was named as the 2016 Vlisco Brand Ambassador.

== Early life and education ==
Born Regina Fremah Agyare, she attended Holy Child High School, Cape Coast, for her secondary education. She is an alumna of Ashesi University and a member of the 2005 class.

== Career ==
=== Soronko Academy ===
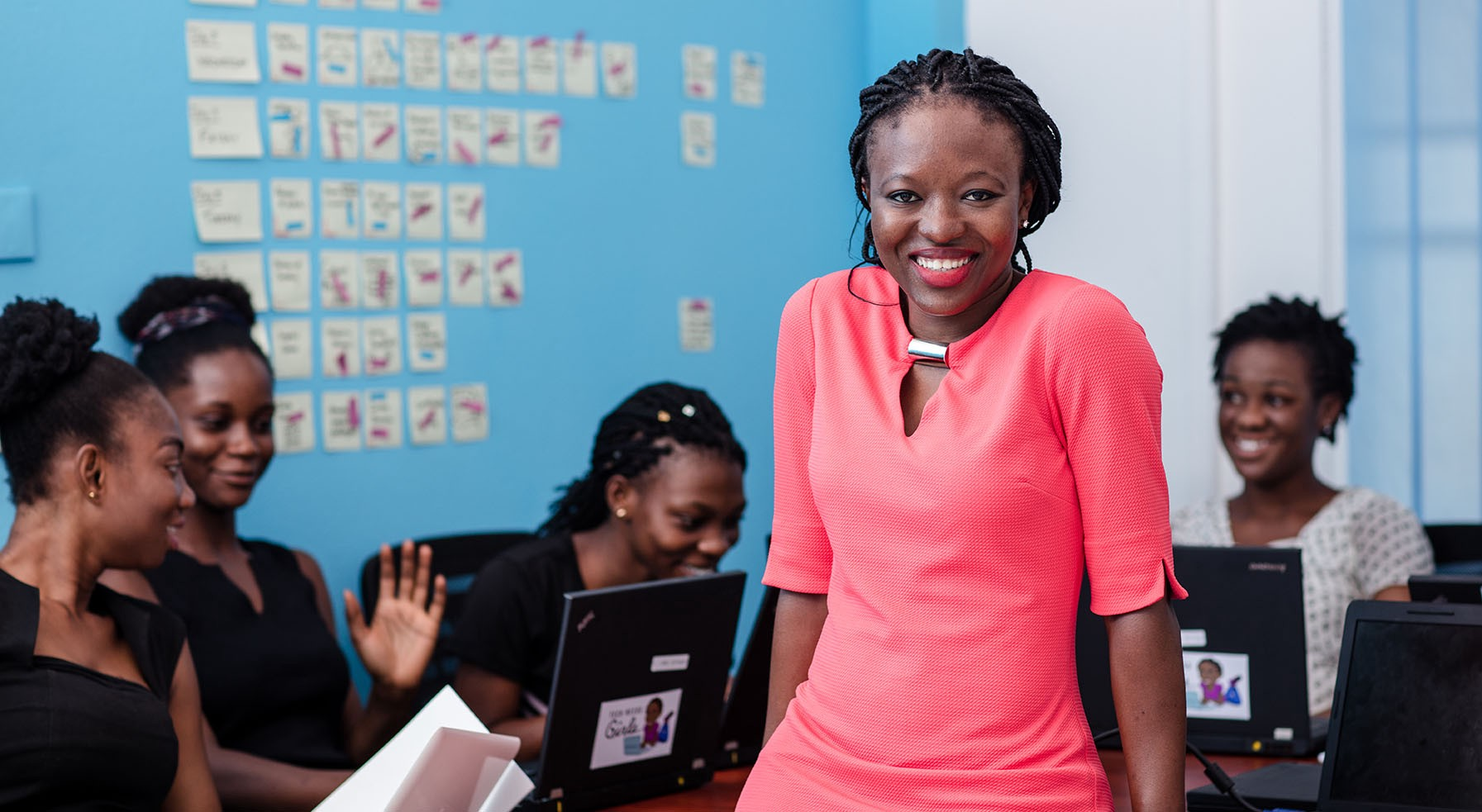
Honu teaching girls to code and create technology

Regina Honu set up the Soronko Foundation in 2012, which brought about the Soronko Academy in 2017, to train children and young adults in coding, IT skills, human-centered design in Ghana, West Africa. The academy was started to help young people especially women and equip them in technical and soft skills necessary to help them in the society and bridge the gender gap in technology. It is the first coding and Human-centered design school for children and young adults in West Africa. By 2021, the programme is estimated to have trained more than 20,000 women and girls.

Through Soronko Academy, Regina Honu is working to close the technology gap in West Africa by providing thousands of women and girls with both technical and soft skills that provide opportunities to impactful careers and reduce the gender gap in the tech industry. The academy has also become a source of recruitment for technology companies looking to hire qualified women. Honu and her team also engage with local gatekeepers—pastors, imams, mothers, and teachers—to support the success of their students.

Honu places an emphasis on mentorship as a central role of Soronko Academy’s goal, especially through a model of “reverse mentoring” that inspires students to become mentors within their own communities as well. This strategy creates a lasting network of leadership and support among women and girls through multiple communities. The academy provides online and in-person courses to extend access, and provide guidance as students move into the workforce or further education. Mentorship is completed through training in essential 21st-century skills, from public speaking, problem-solving, financial literacy, to digital proficiency.

==== Tech Needs Girls ====
Honu started the Tech Needs Girls Ghana movement, which aims to train and educate more Ghanaian girls into studying technology-related courses. The movement is noted for teaching girls how to code.

She runs the Soronko Academy, the first coding and human-centered design school in West Africa, in association with the Tech Needs Girls programme, which has trained more than 3,500 girls in Ghana and Burkina Faso.

=== Social Impact ===
Honu has pointed out systemic barriers girls face through the education in Ghana, including early marriage, young pregnancy, poverty, and violence that is gender-based. She noted that girls in Ghana stay in school for an average of only four years. She commended initiatives like girls-only schools launched by Oxfam and the Ghana Education Service, which grew from one school in 2008 to 44 by 2018. These efforts contribute to coming closer to gender equality in Ghana’s schooling systems.

=== Partnership ===
As part of World Autism Day 2018, Honu partnered with Autism Ambassadors of Ghana for an autism awareness session. The session helped to create awareness about autism and introduced an Autism Aid App that enable families of children living with autism to access information from experts on how to take care of these kids.

== Personal life ==
She married in November 2015 and is now known as Regina Honu.

== Awards and achievements ==
- Ashoka fellow
- She is an Aspen Institute New Voices Fellow
- A Mandela Washington Fellow (Young African Leaders Initiative)
- A member of the World Economic Forum community of Global Shapers
- Vital Voices VV lead fellow and part of the 100 exceptional women from the Vital Voices Global Leadership Network
- A GOOD Global Fellow
- She is a change leader with Tigo Reach For Change

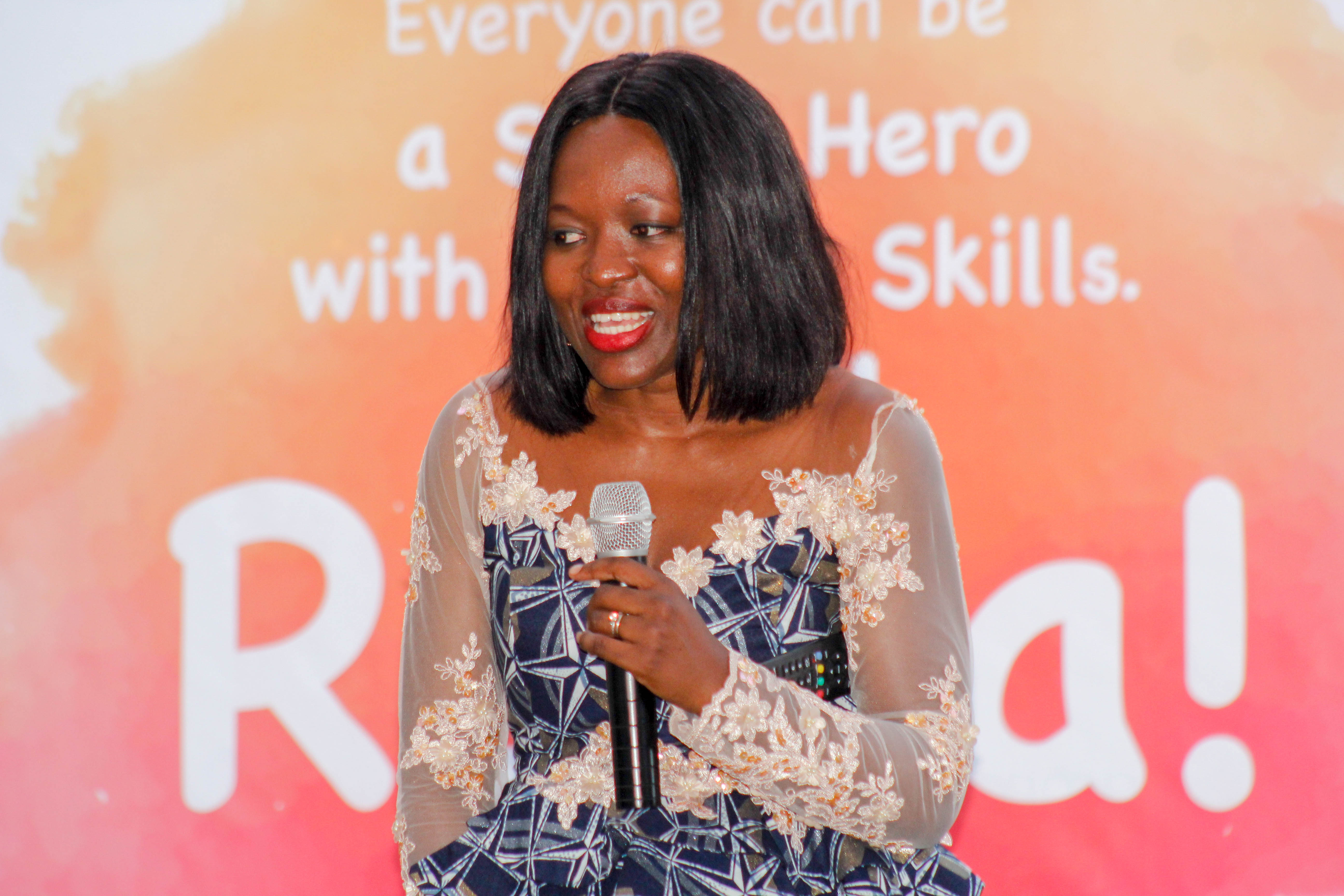
Honu at the launch of Rama

- She recently won the 2017 Buffett Award for Emerging Global Leaders from Northwestern University.
- She was honoured as one of Coca-Cola 60 Young achievers with an outstanding performance in Technology
- She was then awarded the Big Six award from Coca-Cola Ghana for her incredible contribution in Technology.
- She won the 2016 Startup Entrepreneur of the year and her organization won the Social Enterprise Startup of the Year in the 2016 Ghana StartUp Awards.
- She also won the JCI Ghana Outstanding Young Person award for scientific and technological advancement.
- Her organization was nominated for the editor's choice award in the Women in IT award in the UK
- She was a finalist for the ITU African Digital Woman of the Year.
- She was awarded a Women of Courage Award for Technology
- She is on the project advisory board of the UN Committee for the Rights of a Child, helping to update the Convention for the Rights of the Child for a Digital Age
- Tech Needs Girls was honoured in the 2014 Ghana CSR Diary Awards.
- 100 Women of the year 2017 by the BBC
- In 2021, Honu was added to the Quartz Africa Innovators List, which accredited more than 24 women from 12 countries and 15 sectors whose contributions in the workforce challenge the assumption that women primarily operate in social sectors.
- She became a designated Leadership Champion and Observer to the Governing Committee of the Women Entrepreneurs Finance Initiative (We-Fi), organized by the World Bank Group. We-Fi consists of being a global partnership that confronts financial and non-financial issues commonly faced by women-led enterprises both small and large in size, in developing countries.
- Soronko Academy won the award of the Most Impactful Initiative at the Women in Tech Global Awards in 2020. Honu received the 2018 Active Global Citizen Award and was a winner of the Challenging Norms, Powering Economies initiative by Ashoka, UN Women, and the Open Society Foundations for her involvement in challenging gender stereotypes in economic empowerment.
- She has also been ranked one of the top 50 young CEOs in Ghana and acknowledged as a Technical and Vocational Education and Training (TVET) Role Model by Ghana’s Ministry of Education through COTVET. Honu also serves on the board of AFS International.

== See also ==
- Timeline of women in computing
- 100 Women (BBC)
