= Gillian Docherty =

British computer scientist and CEO

Gillian Docherty CBE
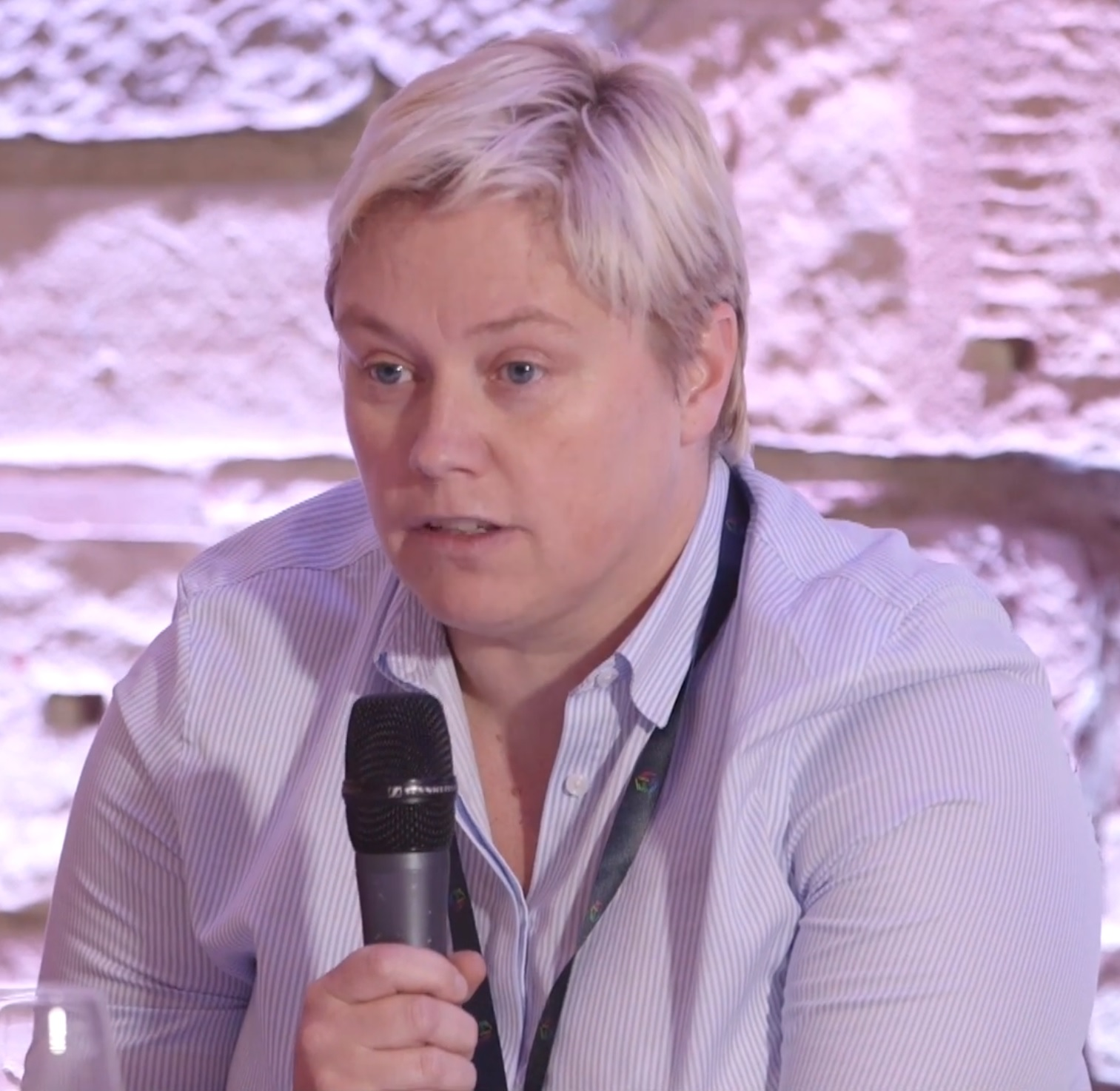
- Docherty at the UK Data Service Data Impact 2016 event
- Education: University of Glasgow
- Employer: University of Strathclyde

Gillian Docherty CBE is a British computer scientist. She is Chief Commercial Officer at the University of Strathclyde and Past President of Glasgow Chamber of Commerce. From 2015 to 2022 she was the CEO of The Data Lab, the Scottish innovation centre for data science and artificial intelligence. She was appointed the first Chair of Scotland's AI Alliance in 2021, created to implement the activities of Scotland's AI Strategy.

== Education ==
Docherty completed a computer science degree at the University of Glasgow and was awarded an honorary doctorate in technology from Robert Gordon University.

== Career ==
Docherty joined IBM in 1993 and spent 22 years working in technical sales, financial services, hardware and software. She became a UK senior executive and led the team responsible for driving IBM software propositions to Scottish clients.

Docherty became CEO of The Data Lab in June 2015. The Data Lab was established in 2014, and by 2018 had completed over 100 data science projects in Scotland, estimating that it had generated more than £100 million extra revenue for Scotland's economy. The Data Lab has hubs in Aberdeen, Inverness, Edinburgh and Glasgow and as of 2018 had received over £25m in funding from Scottish Funding Council, Scottish Government, Scottish Enterprise, and Highland and Islands Enterprise. In 2015 she launched The Data Lab's MSc programme and in 2016 doubled the cohort to meet the rising demand in big data.

She has spoken at many events including the Big Data Analytics conference and the Glasgow Business Summit. In June 2017 she delivered a TEDx talk entitled 2037 - Who's leading? Who's following?. She won the 2017 CEO Of The Year at the ScotlandIS Digital Technology Awards.

She is Chair of the Board of CodeBase, a tech ecosystem support organisation that has supported over 500 startups and scaleups, who have collectively raised over £4 billion. CodeBase promotes collaboration in tech innovation, by working with startups, scaleups, corporates, governments, academia and the third sector.

She is a Past President of Glasgow Chamber of Commerce. In 2022 Docherty was appointed chief commercial officer of the University of Strathclyde. She is also a trustee of several charities, and works as a startup adviser..

== Awards and recognition ==
In March 2017 Docherty was described as one of The Scotsman's most influential women in technology. In 2017 she was listed in the top 10 most influential data professionals in the UK. In 2018 was named Digital Leader for the UK. She also received an Outstanding Achievement Award at Scotland’s Women in Technology Awards in 2019. Docherty was appointed Officer of the Order of the British Empire (OBE) in the 2019 Birthday Honours for services to information technology and business. She was then appointed Commander of the British Empire (CBE) in the 2025 New Years Honours for services to information technology and business. She was elected a Fellow of the Royal Society of Edinburgh in 2024.

== Personal ==
Docherty is married with a daughter who appeared on stage with her during her TEDx talk.
