= Noriko H. Arai =

Japanese mathematician (born 1962)

- 新井紀子
- Born: 1962 (age 63–64); Tokyo, Japan
- Education: Hitotsubashi University (Law) University of Illinois at Urbana–Champaign (B.S. in Mathematics, magna cum laude) Tokyo Institute of Technology (Ph.D.)
- Known for: Todai Robot Project, Researchmap
- Notable work: Project to develop AI capable of passing University of Tokyo entrance exams
- Scientific career
- Fields: Mathematical logic, Artificial intelligence
- Workplaces: National Institute of Informatics

Noriko H. Arai (Japanese: 新井紀子, romanized: Arai Noriko, born 1962) is a Japanese researcher in mathematical logic and artificial intelligence, known for her work on a project to develop robots that can pass the entrance examinations for the University of Tokyo. She is a professor in the information and society research division of the National Institute of Informatics.

== Early life and education ==
Professor Noriko H. Arai was born in Tokyo. During her time at Tokyo Metropolitan Kunitachi High School, her strongest subject in high school was Japanese language arts which led her to pursue a liberal arts degree for her undergraduate studies at Hitotsubashi University. She received a bachelor’s degree from the Faculty of Law; this type of degree is different from a J.D. and instead emphasizes sending human resources into society. At Hitotsubashi University, math was a required subject which led to Arai’s interest in understanding the process behind the math itself. With this renewed desire, she took the SAT and TOEFL exams to study abroad at the University of Illinois in the Department of Mathematics. She graduated magna cum laude from the Department of Mathematics at the University of Illinois in her first year in 1985. Arai then received a scholarship to enter the five-year doctoral program in mathematics at the University of Illinois Graduate School, but she instead completed her master's degree in 1990. While at the University of Illinois, she married mathematician Toshiyasu Arai. She returned to Tokyo in 1990. At the time, she was 7 months pregnant. With the University’s support she was able to still finish her degree. After giving birth to her first daughter, she completed her Bachelor of Law from Hitotsubashi University in March of 1995. She became an assistant professor in the Faculty of Information Science at Hiroshima University, where her husband worked. Afterwards, she received her Doctor in Science from the Tokyo Institute of Technology in March of 1997. Her dissertation was: "On Lengths of Proofs in Propositional Calculi." She joined the National Institute of Informatics as a professor in 2001.

== Contributions ==
Arai's recent research has focussed on the intersection between Artificial Intelligence and education. Alongside several co-authors, Arai contributed as the last author to a 2018 paper called "Can an A.I. win a medal in the mathematical olympiad? – Benchmarking mechanized mathematics on pre-university problems" published in AI Communications, in which her team created a "problem library [...] designed to support the integration of the technologies of mechanized mathematics and natural language processing towards the goal of end-to-end automatic mathematical problem solving". This paper acts as an extension to Matsuzaki et al. (2017), "Semantic parsing of pre-university math problems" for which Arai and her team developed an "end-to-end math problem solving system that accepts natural language input." Beyond mathematical education, Arai has also contributed to research on reading and language skills, developing a Reading Skill Tests to compare AI and human reading comprehension skills. The Reading Skill Test was developed in collaboration with the Japanese Ministry of Education, Culture, Sports, Science, and Technology, and the test was administered to over 40,000 students. Her early publications examine mathematical proof systems, particularly within the fields of calculus and combinatorics.

In 2011, the National Institute of Informatics launched "The Todai Robot Project (Can a robot get into the University of Tokyo?", an Artificial Intelligence initiative aimed at creating a robot capable of answering real questions from the University of Tokyo entrance examinations. Arai became director of the project in 2011. The examination includes eight subject tests, including two social studies, two sciences, Japanese and Chinese classics, English, and two mathematics. Over 500 thousand high school graduates participate in standardized admissions exams each year in Japan, yet fewer than fifteen thousand students are permitted to advance to the selective University of Tokyo test. In 2015, Arai published her paper: "The impact of AI: can a robot get into the University of Tokyo?", which announced her team's Todai Robot achieved a score above the median human test taker, yet below the average score of those admitted to the University of Tokyo. Still, the robot was "competent enough to pass the entrance exams of 472 out of 581 private universities in Japan". The Todai robot received international attention, and was the subject of Professor Arai's 2017 TEDTalk. Arai sees the success of the project as evidence that human education should concentrate more on problem solving and creativity, and less on rote learning. Arai won multiple awards for her work related to the Todai Robot Project, including the Association for Natural Language Processing's 30th Anniversary Paper Award in 2024.

Arai is also an award-winning author. Her book, AI vs. Children Who Can't Read Textbooks, grapples with the problems with the education system in Japan and discusses the future of AI. The book won the Okawa Publishing Award in 2018, a TOPPOINT Award for the First Half of 2018, the 66th Japan Essayist Club Award, the 2019 Business Book Award, and others.

Arai is the founder of Researchmap, "the largest social network for researchers in Japan". She was one of 15 top artificial intelligence researchers invited by French president Emmanuel Macron to join him in March 2018 for the announcement of a major new French initiative for artificial intelligence research.

== Selected publications ==
- Noriko Arai's Reading Comprehension Training, published by Toyo Keizai, 2025.
- Shin Reading Comprehension, published by Toyo Keizai, 2025.
- Detour Pan! Introduction to Mathematics for Survival (New and Expanded Edition), published by Shinyosha, 2021.
- Raising children who can compete with AI, published by Toyo Keizai, 2018.
- AI vs. Children Who Can't Read Textbooks, published by Toyo Keizai, 2018.
- Detour Pan! Can a Cellobot get into Tokyo University? Published by East Press, 2014.

== Selected awards ==
- 2024: Association for Natural Language Processing's 30th Anniversary Paper Award
- 2022: Minister of Education, Culture, Sports, Science and Technology Award for Science and Technology (Science and Technology Promotion Division).
- 2022: 4th Japan Treasure Summit Academic Award
- 2019: Business Book Awards Grand Prize
- 2018: Ishibashi Tanzan Award
- 2018: Okawa Publishing Award
- 2018: Avon Woman of the Year Award in Education
- 2018: Japan Human Resources Department HR Awards Book Category Excellence Award
- 2018: PHP Institute's 27th Yamamoto Shichihei Award
- 2018: 66th Japan Essayist Club Award
- 2018: TOPPOINT Award
- 2016: Outstanding Paper Award, Natural Language Processing Association
- 2015: Trivia Publishing Award
- 2010: The Ministry of Education, Culture, Sports, Science and Technology, Prizes for Science and Technology, the Commendation for Science and Technology.
- 2009: NISTEP Award from National Institute of Science and Technology Policy
