= Automatic Relay Calculator =

1940s electromechanical computer

The Automatic Relay Calculator (ARC) was an early electromechanical computer developed at Birkbeck College, University of London in the mid-1940s. Designed by Andrew Donald Booth and constructed primarily by Kathleen Booth (née Britten) and research assistant Xenia Sweeting, the machine was initially conceived as a special-purpose calculator for Fourier synthesis in X-ray crystallography research. The ARC became historically significant as the platform for the first assembly language, developed by Kathleen Booth, who also co-designed the machine's programming architecture and co-authored its foundational technical documentation. The machine was built at the British Rubber Producers' Research Association facilities in Welwyn Garden City, England.

== Development ==
=== Origins ===
Andrew Booth began working on automated calculation during his employment as a mathematical physicist at the British Rubber Producers' Research Association (BRPRA) from 1943 to 1945. His research on crystal structures using X-ray diffraction data involved extensive tedious computations, providing strong motivation for automation. Booth initially designed the ARC while at BRPRA, conceiving it as a relay-based computer using paper tape for input, primarily functioning as a Fourier synthesizer for crystallography calculations.

In 1946, Booth moved to Birkbeck College, University of London as a Nuffield Research Fellow, though he maintained his connection with BRPRA as a consultant. This relationship proved crucial, as BRPRA funded the ARC project and provided workshop facilities for its construction. Due to lack of space at Birkbeck College, the actual building of the ARC took place at BRPRA's Welwyn Garden City facilities.

At Birkbeck, Booth was joined by Kathleen Britten, who served as his research assistant beginning in 1946. Along with another research assistant, Xenia Sweeting, they formed one of the smallest computing groups in Britain. Britten and Sweeting performed most of the actual hardware construction of the ARC, while Britten also contributed to the machine's design, particularly in developing its programming architecture and methodology.

=== Redesign ===
In 1947, Booth and Britten traveled to the Institute for Advanced Study at Princeton, New Jersey, funded by the Rockefeller Foundation and BRPRA, for a six-month research visit. During this period, they met with John von Neumann, who explained his concept of stored-program computer architecture, as described in his First Draft of a Report on the EDVAC from 1945.

Influenced by von Neumann's ideas, Booth redesigned the ARC to incorporate stored-program architecture. This redesigned version, sometimes referred to as ARC2, was completed quickly, with Booth designing the relay components in approximately two months. The redesign marked a shift from a special-purpose calculator to a more general-purpose computing machine based on von Neumann architecture principles.

== Programming innovation ==
Kathleen Booth's development of the assembly language for the ARC2 represented a pioneering contribution to computer programming. Prior to this work, computers had to be programmed using machine code in binary or by physically rewiring connections. Booth conceived and implemented an innovation that allowed programmers to use human-readable mnemonic codes (such as "MOV" for move operations) that would be automatically translated into machine code by the assembler program she created. This abstraction significantly simplified the programming process and influenced subsequent developments in programming languages.

The "Coding for A.R.C." document, primarily authored by Kathleen Booth, is considered the first published description of an assembly language.

== Legacy ==
The experience gained from building the ARC informed the Booth team's subsequent computer projects. Between 1947 and 1953, they developed three machines: the original ARC, the Simple Electronic Computer (SEC), and the All Purpose Electronic (X) Computer, or APE(X)C. The SEC was an entirely electronic redesign of the ARC2, while the APE(X)C became the basis for the HEC series of computers manufactured by the British Tabulating Machine Company.
