= Irma Wyman =

American computer scientist (1928–2015)

- Born: Irma M. Wyman; January 31, 1928; Detroit, Michigan, U.S.
- Died: November 17, 2015 (aged 87)
- Education: University of Michigan College of Engineering
- Scientific career
- Fields: Computer Science

Irma M. Wyman (January 31, 1928 - November 17, 2015) was an early computer engineer and the first woman to become vice president of Honeywell Inc. She was also the first woman to be the company's CIO and was a systems thinking tutor.

== Academic life ==
In 1945, Wyman received a Regents Scholarship and was accepted into the College of Engineering at the University of Michigan as one of seven female students. To supplement her scholarship, she worked as a switchboard operator and waitress.

At the time, women in engineering programs received little encouragement and support. While her grades qualified her for membership in Tau Beta Pi, the engineering honor society, she received only a "Women's Badge", since the society did not admit women at the time. Wyman graduated with a Bachelor of Science/EM degree in 1949, one of two women in her class.

== Career ==
=== Computing Future Thought Leadership ===
While still a junior in college, Wyman worked on a missile guidance project at the Willow Run Research Center. To calculate trajectory, they used mechanical calculators. She visited the U.S. Naval Proving Ground where Grace Hopper was working on similar problems and discovered they were using a prototype of a programmable Mark II computer developed at Harvard University. She became interested in computers and later recalled that "I became an enthusiastic pioneer in this new technology and it led to my life's career."

After graduation, she joined a start-up company that was eventually acquired by Honeywell Information Systems. She moved to Minneapolis and began a long management career at Honeywell, eventually serving as chief information officer. She became vice president of Honeywell Corporate Information Management (CIM) before retiring in 1990.

Wyman then began a second career as archdeacon in the Minnesota Diocese of the Episcopal Church where she coached servant leadership, retiring again after ten years as Archdeacon of the Diocese of Minnesota.

Wyman supported research and planning as a thought leader in futures studies. As an aside to this, she contended to an interviewer in 1979, that

it's just as important to know when to ignore all the careful planning and seize an opportunity.

Wyman endowed the Irma M. Wyman Scholarship at the University of Michigan's Center for the Education of Women to support women in engineering, computer science and related fields, and she endowed two Irma M. Wyman internships at the Hill Museum & Manuscript Library for women who are juniors and seniors at College of Saint Benedict and Saint John's University. Irma's persistent advocacy for women in computer science and leadership reflects those of her early career mentor, Grace Hopper:

The most important thing I've accomplished ... is training young people. They come to me, you know, and say, 'Do you think we can do this?' I say, "Try it." And I back 'em up. They need that. I keep track of them as they get older and I stir 'em up at intervals so they don't forget to take chances.

=== Awards and honors ===
- Michigan Engineering Alumni Society Medal - 2001
- Honorary Doctor of Engineering, University of Michigan - 2007

== Quote ==
We never get a second chance to make a first impression. (1983–1987)

When sponsoring Honeywell's innovative Corporate Information Management Information Security Awareness Program (ISAP).

== See also ==
- Harvard Mark II
- Women in computing
- Women in engineering
