= Kathleen Booth =

British computer scientist (1922–2022)

- Born: Kathleen Hylda Valerie Britten; 9 July 1922; Stourbridge, Worcestershire, England
- Died: 29 September 2022 (aged 100); Sooke, British Columbia, Canada
- Education: University of London
- Known for: Inventing assembly language
- Spouse: Andrew Booth (m. 1950; died 2009)
- Scientific career
- Fields: Computer science
- Workplaces: Birkbeck College

Kathleen Hylda Valerie Booth (née Britten, 9 July 1922 – 29 September 2022) was a British computer scientist and mathematician who co-wrote the first assembly language and co-designed the assembler and autocode for the first computer systems at Birkbeck College, University of London. She helped design three different machines including the ARC (Automatic Relay Calculator), SEC (Simple Electronic Computer), and APE(X)C.

== Early life and education ==
Hylda Valerie Britten was born in Stourbridge, Worcestershire, England, on 9 July 1922 the second of three children of Gladys May, née Kitchen (1894–1966) and Frederick John Britten (1897–1995), who worked as an Inland Revenue tax clerk. She began using the first name Kathleen in childhood. She grew up in the West Midlands area and attended the King Edward VI Grammar School for Girls in Birmingham. Booth went on to obtain a BSc in mathematics from Royal Holloway, University of London in 1944 and a PhD in Applied Mathematics in 1950 from King's College London.

== Career ==
Kathleen Booth worked at Birkbeck College, 1946–62. She travelled to the United States as Andrew Booth's research assistant in 1947, visiting with John von Neumann at Princeton University. While at Princeton, she co-authored "General Considerations in the Design of an All Purpose Electronic Digital Computer", describing modifications to the original ARC redesign to the ARC2 using a von Neumann architecture. Part of her contribution was the ARC assembly language. She also built and maintained ARC components.

Kathleen and Andrew Booth's team at Birkbeck were considered the smallest of the early British computer groups. From 1947 to 1953, they produced three machines: ARC (Automatic Relay Calculator) built with fellow research assistant Xenia Sweeting, an entirely electronic version of the ARC2 called SEC (Simple Electronic Computer), and APE(X)C (All-purpose Electronic (Rayon) Computer). She and Mr. Booth worked on the same team. This was considered a remarkable achievement due to the size of the group and the limited funds at its disposal. Although APE(X)C eventually led to the HEC series manufactured by the British Tabulating Machine Company, the small scale of the Birkbeck group did not place it in the front rank of British computer activity.

Booth regularly published papers concerning her work on the ARC and APE(X)C systems and co-wrote "Automatic Digital Calculators" (1953) which illustrated the 'Planning and Coding' programming style. In 1957, Kathleen Booth, her husband Andrew, and J.C. Jennings co-founded Birkbeck College's Department of Numerical Automation, now the School of Computing and Mathematical Sciences. In 1958, she taught a programming course.

In 1958, Booth wrote one of the first books describing how to program APE(X)C computers.

From 1944 she was a Junior Scientific Officer at the Royal Aircraft Establishment in Farnborough. From 1946 to 1962, Booth was a Research Scientist at British Rubber Producers' Research Association and for ten years from 1952 to 1962 she was Research Fellow and Lecturer at Birkbeck College, University of London.

Booth's research on neural networks led to successful programs simulating ways in which animals recognize patterns and characters. She and her husband resigned suddenly from Birkbeck College in 1962 after a chair was not conferred on her husband despite his massive contributions; an ICT 1400 computer was donated to the Department of Numerical Automation but was in fact installed in the London School of Hygiene and Tropical Medicine.

On November 11, 1955, Booth and the research group publicly demoed a machine translation prototype that translated the phrase "This is an example of a translation made by the machine for calculation installed at the laboratory of computation of Birkbeck College, London." from French to English. Booth continued her research into automated translation, becoming the director of a Canadian national project on machine translation in 1965.

In 1962, after leaving Birkbeck College the Booth family moved to Canada to where she became a Research Fellow, Lecturer and associate professor at the University of Saskatchewan until 1972. At Lakehead University in Canada she became the Professor of Mathematics from 1972 to 1978. Kathleen Booth retired from Lakehead in 1978. After retiring, the Booths started a consulting business that worked with the Canadian Department of National Defence and the Institute of Ocean Sciences in British Columbia on acoustic modelling and the effects of ocean shipping noise on the communication of marine mammals.

Her last current paper was published in 1993 at the age of 71.

== Personal life and death ==
Booth married her colleague Andrew Donald Booth in 1950 and had two children, Ian, who became a physicist, and Amanda, who became a veterinarian. She was known to be an avid fan of music, but lost her hearing in her thirties due to treatment with the antibiotic streptomycin, which can cause permanent hearing loss.

In 1970, the Booths bought a property near Sooke, British Columbia and moved there full-time in 1978. During her later life in Canada, she became a champion for women in engineering and science in Canada. Kathleen grew vegetables and exotic plants and was active in Sooke's gardening club. She homeschooled her two children, Ian and Amanda. She was an avid hiker and spent time exploring Vancouver Island into her mid-80s.

Booth died in Sooke, British Columbia on 29 September 2022, at the age of 100.

== Bibliography ==
- Booth, Andrew D; Britten, Kathleen HV (September 1947), "Principles and Progress in the Construction of High-Speed Digital Computers", Quart. Journ. Mech. And Applied Math., 2 (2): 182–197, doi:10.1093/qjmam/2.2.182.
- Coding system for the APE(X)C, AU: Murdoch, archived from the original on 7 June 2011.
- Booth A.D. and Britten K.H.V. (1947) Coding for A.R.C., Institute for Advanced Study, Princeton
- Booth A.D. and Britten K.H.V. (August 1947, 2nd Edition) General considerations in the design of an all-purpose electronic digital computer, Institute for Advance Study, Princeton
- Booth A.D. and Britten K.H.V. (1948) "The accuracy of atomic co-ordinates derived from Fourier series in X-ray crystallography Part V", Proc. Roy. Soc. Vol A 193 pp 305–310
- Booth A.D. and Booth K.H.V. (1953) Automatic Digital Calculators, Butterworth-Heinmann (Academic Press) London
- K.H.V Booth, (1958) Programming for an Automatic Digital Calculator, Butterworths, London
- I. J. Booth and K. H. V. Booth (1993) Using neural nets to identify marine mammals (Proceedings of OCEANS '93), Victoria, BC, Canada, vol.3 pp. III112-III115

== See also ==
- List of pioneers in computer science
- Booth's multiplication algorithm
- Assembly language
