= Mechanical calculator =

Mechanical machine for arithmetic operations for absolute calculators

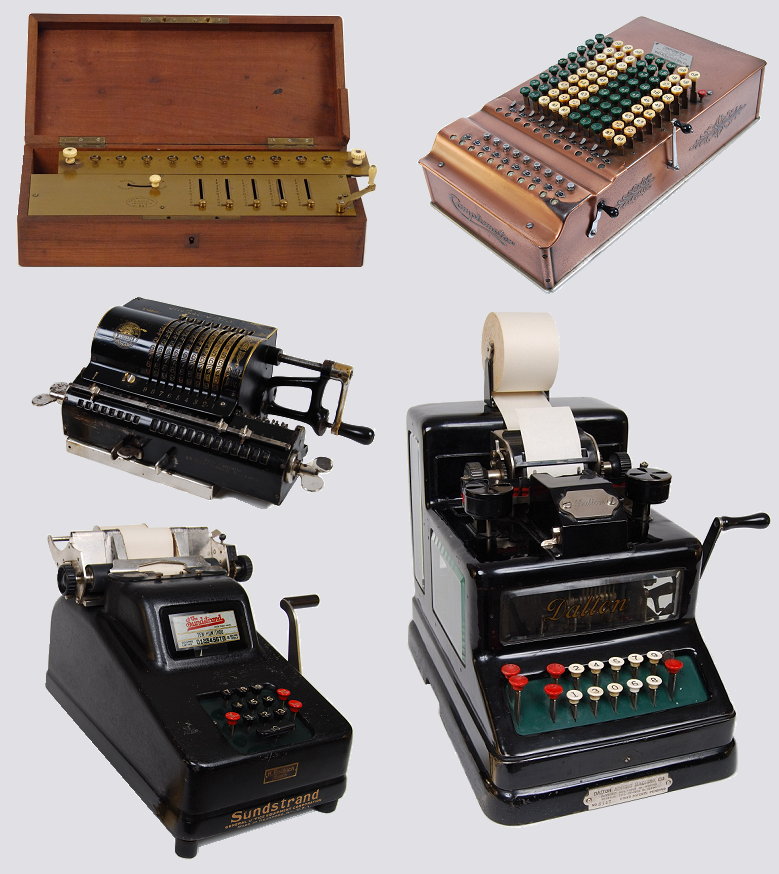
Various desktop mechanical calculators used in the office from 1851 onwards. Each one has a different user interface. This picture shows clockwise from top left: An Arithmometer, a Comptometer, a Dalton adding machine, a Sundstrand, and an Odhner Arithmometer

A mechanical calculator, or calculating machine, is a mechanical device used to perform the basic operations of arithmetic automatically, an improvement over earlier analog computers such as the slide rule. Most mechanical calculators were comparable in size to small desktop computers and have been rendered obsolete by the advent of the electronic calculator and the digital computer.

In 1642, Blaise Pascal invented the first operational mechanical calculator to be produced in substantial quantities. The 17th century also saw the invention of the Leibniz wheel, which would be used in many mechanical calculators until the invention of the electronic calculator in the mid-1970s.

During the 18th century, several inventors in Europe were working on a four-species mechanical calculator; one which could perform the four classical operations. Working machines were constructed, but due to the enormous amount of manual work and high precision needed for these machines, most were never put into production.

Thomas' arithmometer, the first commercially successful machine, was manufactured in 1851; it was the first mechanical calculator strong enough and reliable enough to be used daily in an office environment.

The comptometer, introduced in 1887, was the first machine to use a keyboard that consisted of columns of nine keys (from 1 to 9) for each digit. The Dalton adding machine, manufactured in 1902, was the first to have a 10 key keyboard. Electric motors were used on some mechanical calculators from 1901. In 1961, a comptometer type machine, the Anita Mk VII from Sumlock, became the first desktop mechanical calculator to receive an all-electronic calculator engine, creating the link in between these two industries and marking the beginning of its decline. The production of mechanical calculators came to a stop in the middle of the 1970s closing an industry that had lasted for 120 years.

Mechanical calculators are notable as the precursor to modern digital computers. Charles Babbage designed two important mechanical calculators: first his difference engine in 1822, which was the first automatic calculator; and second his analytical engine in 1834, which was the first programmable calculator. These devices gave the blueprint for the mainframe computers of the 20th century.

== Ancient history ==
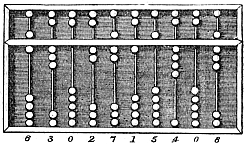
A Chinese Suanpan (the number represented in the picture is 6,302,715,408)

The desire to economize time and mental effort in arithmetical computations, and to eliminate human liability to error, is probably as old as the science of arithmetic itself. This desire has led to the design and construction of a variety of aids to calculation, beginning with groups of small objects, such as pebbles, first used loosely, later as counters on ruled boards, and later still as beads mounted on wires fixed in a frame, as in the abacus. This instrument was probably invented by the Semitic races (Note: An obsolete classification with possible discriminatory connotations, see Semitic_people#Antisemitism) and later adopted in India, whence it spread westward throughout Europe and eastward to China and Japan.
After the development of the abacus, no further advances were made until John Napier devised his numbering rods, or Napier's Bones, in 1617. Various forms of the Bones appeared, some approaching the beginning of mechanical computation, but it was not until 1642 that Blaise Pascal gave us the first mechanical calculating machine in the sense that the term is used today.

— Howard Aiken, Proposed automatic calculating machine, presented to IBM in 1937

A short list of other precursors to the mechanical calculator must include a group of mechanical analog computers which, once set, are only modified by the continuous and repeated action of their actuators (crank handle, weight, wheel, water...). Before the common era, there are odometers and the Antikythera mechanism, a seemingly out of place, unique, geared astronomical clock, followed more than a millennium later by early mechanical clocks, geared astrolabes and followed in the 15th century by pedometers. These machines were all made of toothed gears linked by some sort of carry mechanisms. These machines always produce identical results for identical initial settings unlike a mechanical calculator where all the wheels are independent but are also linked together by the rules of arithmetic.

== The 17th century ==
=== Overview ===
The 17th century marked the beginning of the history of mechanical calculators, as it saw the invention of its first machines. This included Pascal's calculator, also called the Pascaline, in 1642, which had better tens-carry than earlier models and was able to perform computations that were previously thought to be only humanly possible. Concerned about his father's exhausting work as tax collector in Rouen, Blaise Pascal designed the Pascaline to help with the large amount of tedious arithmetic required.

In a sense, Pascal's invention was premature, in that the mechanical arts in his time were not sufficiently advanced to enable his machine to be made at an economic price, with the accuracy and strength needed for reasonably long use. This difficulty was not overcome until well on into the nineteenth century, by which time also a renewed stimulus to invention was given by the need for many kinds of calculation more intricate than those considered by Pascal.

— S. Chapman, Pascal tercentenary celebration, London, (1942)

The 17th century also saw the invention of some very powerful tools to aid arithmetic calculations like Napier's bones, logarithmic tables and the slide rule which, for their ease of use by scientists in multiplying and dividing, ruled over and impeded the use and development of mechanical calculators until the production release of the arithmometer in the mid 19th century.

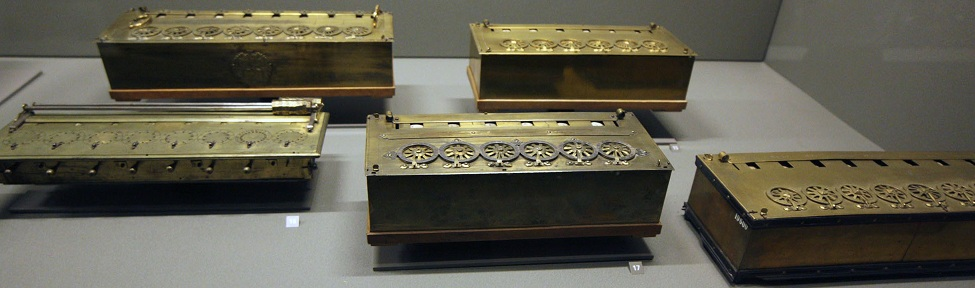
Four of Pascal's calculators and one machine built by Lépine in 1725, Musée des Arts et Métiers

=== Invention of the mechanical calculator ===
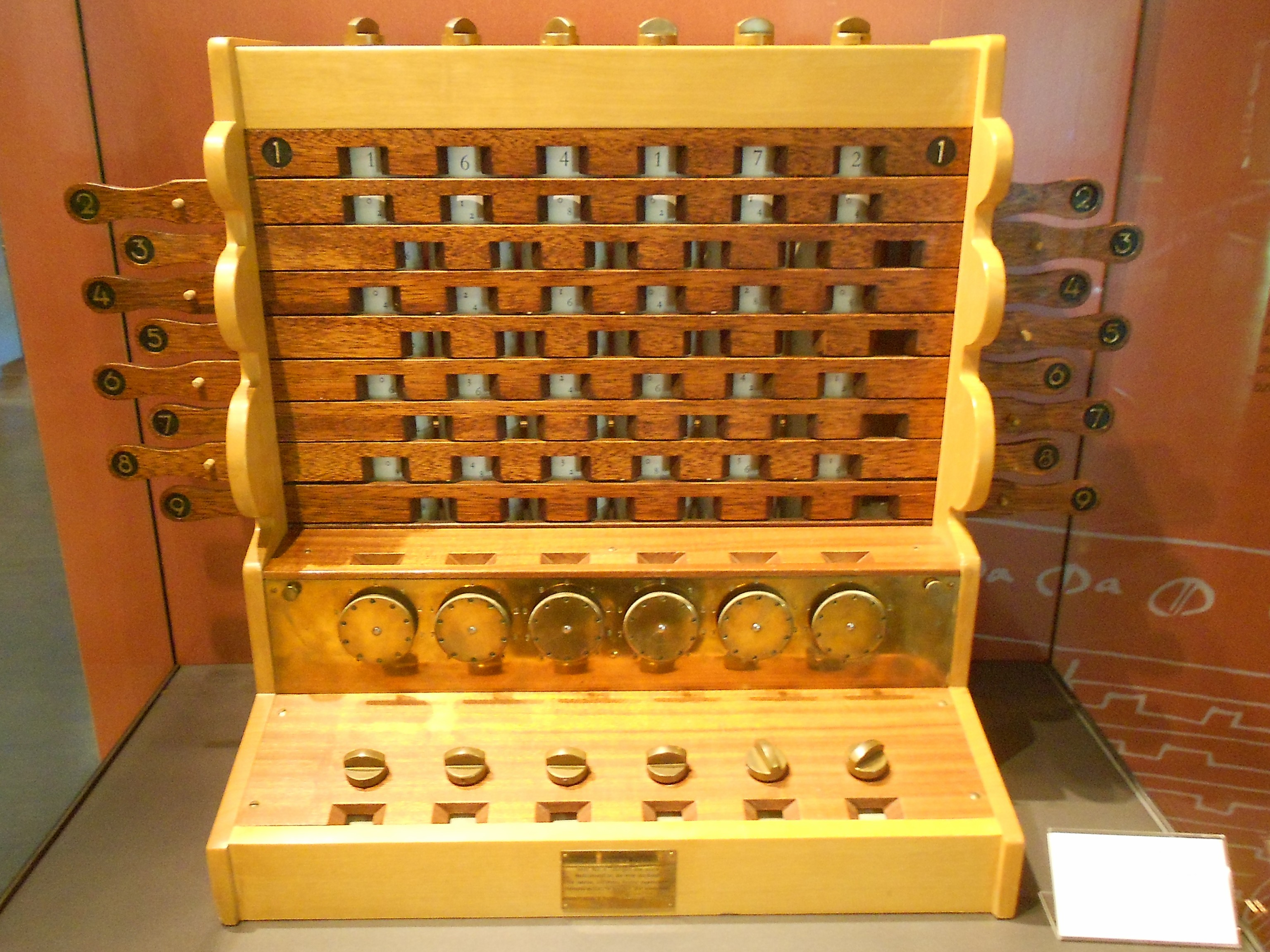
Replica of Schickard´s calculator

In 1623 and 1624 Wilhelm Schickard, in two letters that he sent to Johannes Kepler, reported his design and construction of what he referred to as an “arithmeticum organum” (“arithmetical instrument”), which would later be described as a Rechenuhr (calculating clock). The machine was designed to assist in all the four basic functions of arithmetic (addition, subtraction, multiplication and division). Amongst its uses, Schickard suggested it would help in the laborious task of calculating astronomical tables. The machine could add and subtract six-digit numbers, and indicated an overflow of this capacity by ringing a bell. The adding machine in the base was primarily provided to assist in the difficult task of adding or multiplying two multi-digit numbers. To this end an ingenious arrangement of rotatable Napier's bones were mounted on it. It even had an additional "memory register" to record intermediate calculations. Whilst Schickard noted that the adding machine was working, his letters mention that he had asked a professional, a clockmaker named Johann Pfister, to build a finished machine. Regrettably it was destroyed in a fire either whilst still incomplete, or in any case before delivery. Schickard abandoned his project soon after. He and his entire family were wiped out in 1635 by bubonic plague during the Thirty Years' War.

Schickard's machine used clock wheels which were made stronger and were therefore heavier, to prevent them from being damaged by the force of an operator input. Each digit used a display wheel, an input wheel and an intermediate wheel. During a carry transfer all these wheels meshed with the wheels of the digit receiving the carry.

Blaise Pascal invented a mechanical calculator with a sophisticated carry mechanism in 1642. After three years of effort and 50 prototypes he introduced his calculator to the public. He built twenty of these machines in the following ten years. This machine could add and subtract two numbers directly and multiply and divide by repetition. Since, unlike Schickard's machine, the Pascaline dials could only rotate in one direction zeroing it after each calculation required the operator to dial in all 9s and then (method of re-zeroing) propagate a carry right through the machine. This suggests that the carry mechanism would have proved itself in practice many times over. This is a testament to the quality of the Pascaline because none of the 17th and 18th century criticisms of the machine mentioned a problem with the carry mechanism and yet it was fully tested on all the machines, by their resets, all the time.

Pascal's invention of the calculating machine, just three hundred years ago, was made while he was a youth of nineteen. He was spurred to it by seeing the burden of arithmetical labour involved in his father's official work as supervisor of taxes at Rouen. He conceived the idea of doing the work mechanically, and developed a design appropriate for this purpose; showing herein the same combination of pure science and mechanical genius that characterized his whole life. But it was one thing to conceive and design the machine, and another to get it made and put into use. Here were needed those practical gifts that he displayed later in his inventions...

— S. Chapman, Pascal tercentenary celebration, London, (1942)

In the position shown, the counting wheel meshes with three of the nine teeth of the Leibniz wheel.

In 1672, Gottfried Leibniz started working on adding direct multiplication to what he understood was the working of Pascal's calculator. However, it is doubtful that he had ever fully seen the mechanism and his intended method could not have worked because of the lack of reversible rotation in the device. Accordingly, he eventually designed an entirely new machine called the Stepped Reckoner; it was first two-motion calculator, the first to use cursors (creating a memory of the first operand), and the first to have a movable carriage. Leibniz built two Stepped Reckoners, one in 1694 and one in 1706. Only the machine built in 1694 is known to still exist; it was rediscovered at the end of the 19th century having been forgotten in an attic in the University of Göttingen.

The Stepped Reckoner used his Leibniz wheel, also called a stepped drum, which has teeth of incremental lengths, allowing a gear to mesh with more or fewer teeth by moving up and down the cylinder. The Leibniz wheel was used in many calculating machines for 200 years, and into the 1970s with the Curta hand calculator, until the advent of the electronic calculator in the mid-1970s.

Leibniz was also the first to promote the idea of a pinwheel calculator.

In 1893, the German calculating machine inventor Arthur Burkhardt was asked to put Leibniz's machine in operating condition if possible. His report was favorable except for the sequence in the carry.

Leibniz had invented his namesake wheel and the principle of a two-motion calculator, but after forty years of development he wasn't able to produce a machine that was fully operational; this makes Pascal's calculator the only working mechanical calculator in the 17th century. Leibniz was also the first person to describe a pinwheel calculator. He once said "It is unworthy of excellent men to lose hours like slaves in the labour of calculation which could safely be relegated to anyone else if machines were used."

=== Other calculating machines ===
Schickard, Pascal and Leibniz were inevitably inspired by the role of clockwork which was highly celebrated in the seventeenth century. However, simple-minded application of interlinked gears was insufficient for any of their purposes. Schickard introduced the use of a single toothed "mutilated gear" to enable the carry to take place. Pascal improved on that with his famous weighted sautoir. Leibniz went even further in relation to the ability to use a moveable carriage to perform multiplication more efficiently, albeit at the expense of a fully working carry mechanism.

...I devised a third which works by springs and which has a very simple design. This is the one, as I have already stated, that I used many times, hidden in the plain sight of an infinity of persons and which is still in operating order. Nevertheless, while always improving on it, I found reasons to change its design...

— Pascal, Advertisement Necessary to those who have curiosity to see the Arithmetic Machine, and to operate it (1645)

When, several years ago, I saw for the first time an instrument which, when carried, automatically records the numbers of steps by a pedestrian, it occurred to me at once that the entire arithmetic could be subjected to a similar kind of machinery so that not only counting but also addition and subtraction, multiplication and division could be accomplished by a suitably arranged machine easily, promptly, and with sure results.

— Leibniz, on his calculating machine (1685)

The principle of the clock (input wheels and display wheels added to a clock-like mechanism) for a direct-entry calculating machine couldn't be implemented to create a fully effective calculating machine without additional innovation with the technological capabilities of the 17th century, because their gears would jam when a carry had to be moved several places along the accumulator. The only 17th-century calculating clocks that have survived to this day do not have a machine-wide carry mechanism and therefore cannot be called fully effective mechanical calculators. A much more successful calculating clock was built by the Italian Giovanni Poleni in the 18th century and was a two-motion calculating clock (the numbers are inscribed first and then they are processed).

- In 1623, Wilhelm Schickard, a German professor of Hebrew and Astronomy, designed a calculating clock which he drew on two letters that he wrote to Johannes Kepler. The first machine to be built by a professional was destroyed during its construction and Schickard abandoned his project in 1624. These drawings had appeared in various publications over the centuries, starting in 1718 with a book of Kepler's letters by Michael Hansch, but in 1957 it was presented for the first time as a long-lost mechanical calculator by Dr. Franz Hammer. The building of the first replica in the 1960s showed that Schickard's machine had an unfinished design and therefore wheels and springs were added to make it work. The use of these replicas showed that the single-tooth wheel, when used within a calculating clock, was an inadequate carry mechanism. (see Pascal versus Schickard). This did not mean that such a machine could not be used in practice, but the operator when faced with the mechanism resisting rotation, in the unusual circumstances of a carry being required beyond (say) 3 dials, would need to "help" the subsequent carry to propagate.
- Around 1643, a French clockmaker from Rouen, after hearing of Pascal's work, built what he claimed to be a calculating clock of his own design. Pascal fired all his employees and stopped developing his calculator as soon as he heard of the news. It is only after being assured that his invention would be protected by a royal privilege that he restarted his activity. A careful examination of this calculating clock showed that it didn't work properly and Pascal called it an avorton (aborted fetus).
- In 1659, the Italian Tito Livio Burattini built a machine with nine independent wheels, each one of these wheels was paired with a smaller carry wheel. At the end of an operation the user had to either manually add each carry to the next digit or mentally add these numbers to create the final result.
- In 1666, Samuel Morland invented a machine designed to add sums of money, but it was not a true adding machine since the carry was added to a small carry wheel situated above each digit and not directly to the next digit. It was very similar to Burattini's machine. Morland created also a multiplying machines with interchangeable disks based on Napier's bones. Taken together these two machines provided a capacity similar to that of the invention of Schickard, although it is doubtful that Morland ever encountered Schickard's calculating clock.
- In 1673, the French clockmaker René Grillet described in Curiositez mathématiques de l'invention du Sr Grillet, horlogeur à Paris a calculating machine that would be more compact than Pascal's calculator and reversible for subtraction. The only two Grillet machines known have no carry mechanism, displaying three lines of nine independent dials they also have nine rotating napier's rod for multiplication and division. Contrary to Grillet's claim, it was not a mechanical calculator after all.

== The 18th century ==
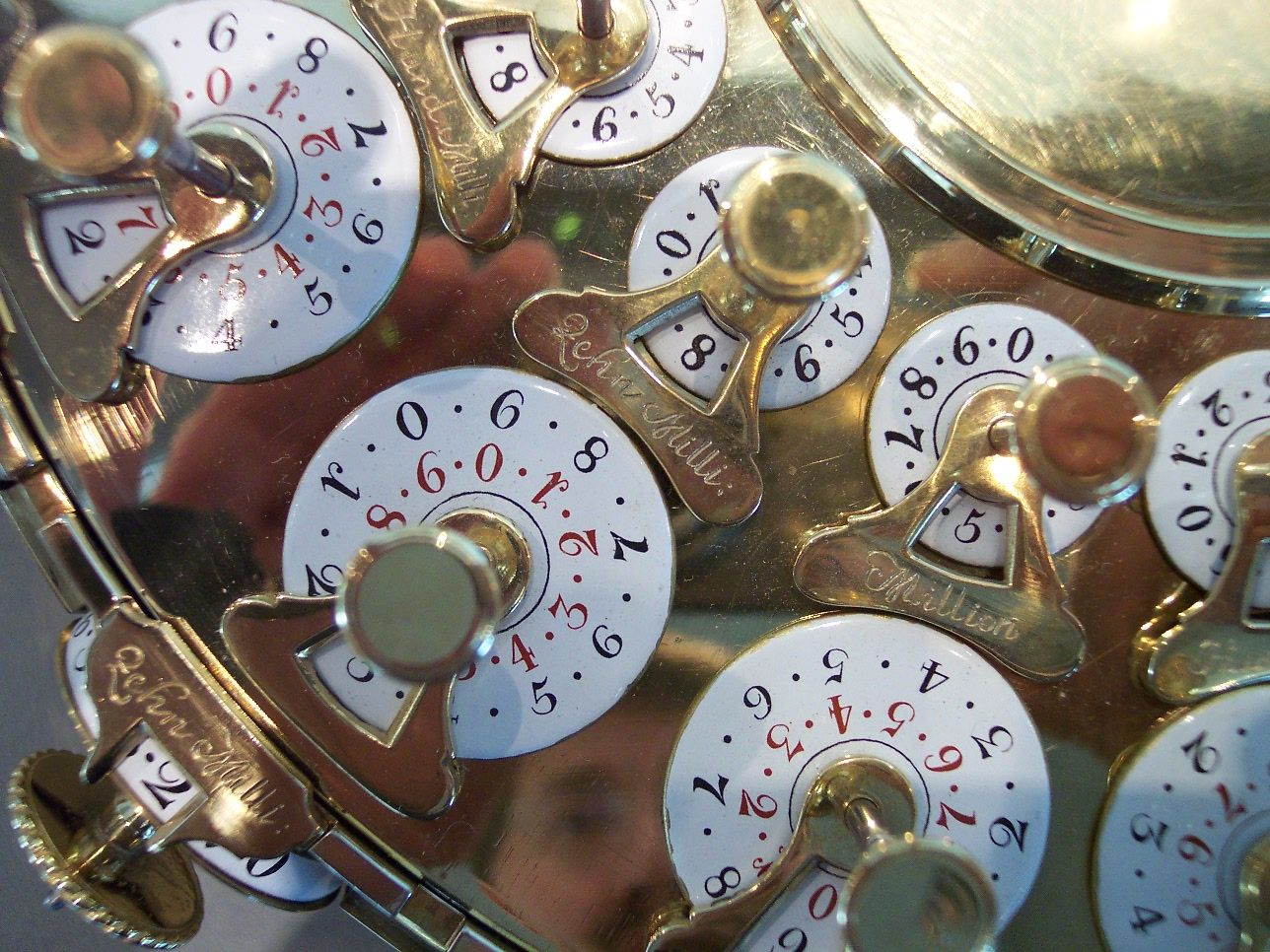
Detail of a replica of an 18th-century calculating machine, designed and built by German Johann-Helfrich Müller.

=== Overview ===
The 18th century saw the first mechanical calculator that could perform a multiplication automatically; designed and built by Giovanni Poleni in 1709 and made of wood, it was the first successful calculating clock.

For all the machines built in this century, division still required the operator to decide when to stop a repeated subtraction at each index, and therefore these machines were only providing a help in dividing, like an abacus. Both pinwheel calculators and Leibniz wheel calculators were built with a few unsuccessful attempts at their commercialization; most remained in cabinets of curiosity of their respective rulers. Only Müller's 1783 machine was put to use tabulating lumber prices; it later came into possession of the landgrave in Darmstadt.

=== Prototypes and limited runs ===
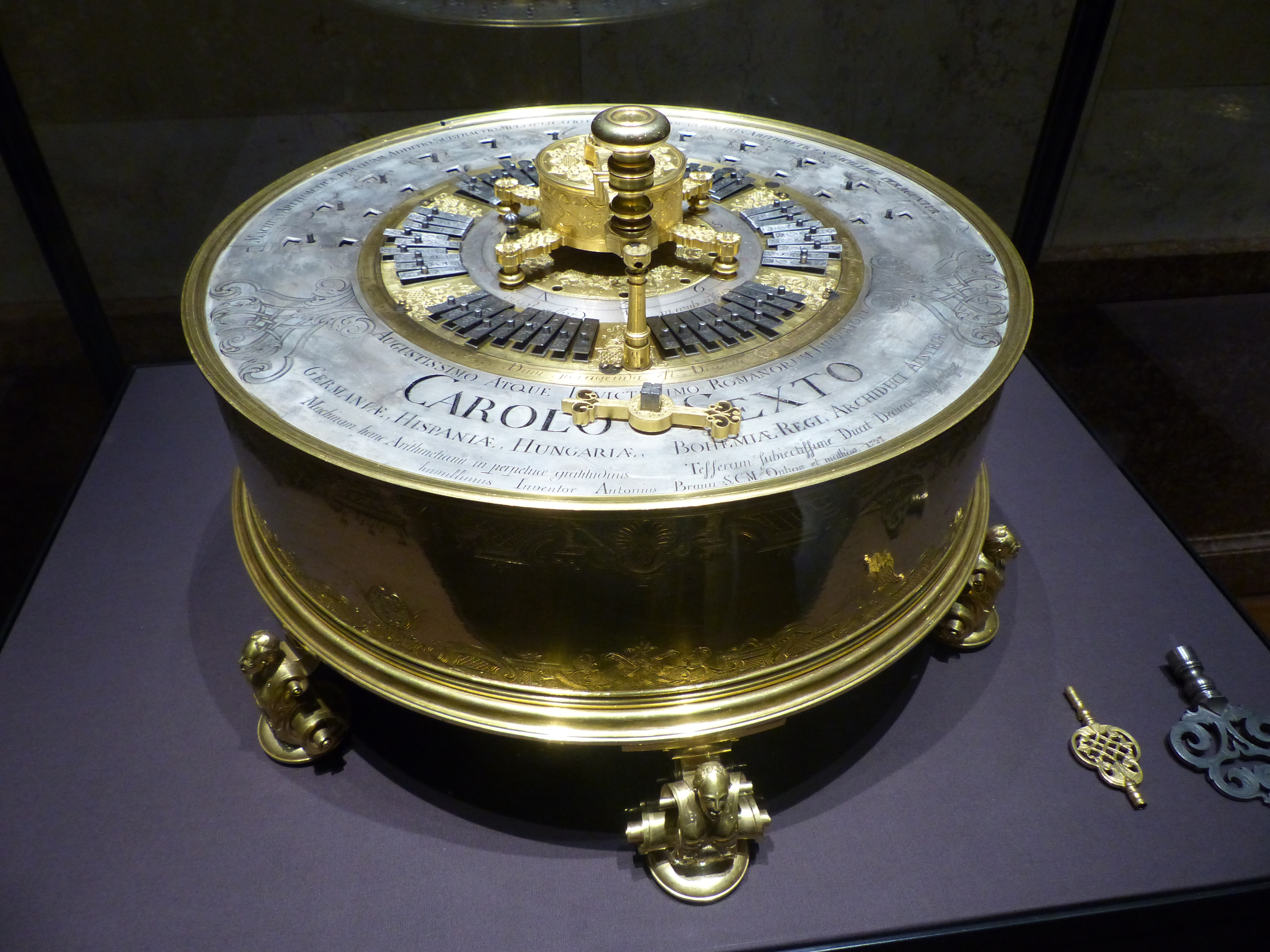
A mechanical calculator from Anton Braun, dated 1727

- In 1709, Italian Giovanni Poleni was the first to build a calculator that could multiply automatically. It used a pinwheel design, was the first operational calculating clock and was made of wood; he destroyed it after hearing that Antonius Braun had received 10,000 Guldens for dedicating a pinwheel machine of his own design to the Holy Roman Emperor Charles VI in Vienna.
- In 1725, the French Academy of Sciences certified a calculating machine derived from Pascal's calculator designed by Lépine, a French craftsman. The machine was a bridge in between Pascal's calculator and a calculating clock. The carry transmissions were performed simultaneously, like in a calculating clock, and therefore "the machine must have jammed beyond a few simultaneous carry transmissions".
- In 1727, German Anton Braun presented the first fully functional four-operation machine to Emperor Charles VI in Vienna. It was cylindrical in shape and was made of steel, silver and brass; it was finely decorated and looked like a renaissance table clock. His dedication to the emperor engraved on the top of the machine also reads "...to make easy to ignorant people, addition, subtraction, multiplication and even division".
- In 1730, the French Academy of Sciences certified three machines designed by Hillerin de Boistissandeau. The first one used a single-tooth carry mechanism which, according to Boistissandeau, wouldn't work properly if a carry had to be moved more than two places; the two other machines used springs that were gradually armed until they released their energy when a carry had to be moved forward. It was similar to Pascal's calculator but instead of using the energy of gravity Boistissandeau used the energy stored into the springs.
- In 1770, Philipp Matthäus Hahn, a German pastor, built two circular calculating machines based on Leibniz' cylinders. J. C. Schuster, Hahn's brother-in-law, built a few machines of Hahn's design into the early 19th century.
- In 1775, Lord Stanhope of the United Kingdom designed a pinwheel machine. It was set in a rectangular box with a handle on the side. He also designed a machine using Leibniz wheels in 1777. "In 1777 Stanhope produced the Logic Demonstrator, a machine designed to solve problems in formal logic. This device marked the beginning of a new approach to the solution of logical problems by mechanical methods."
- In 1784, German Johann-Helfrich Müller built a machine very similar to Hahn's machine.

== The 19th century ==
=== Overview ===
Luigi Torchi invented the first direct multiplication machine in 1834. This was also the second key-driven machine in the world, following that of James White (1822).

The mechanical calculator industry started in 1851 Thomas de Colmar released his simplified Arithmomètre, which was the first machine that could be used daily in an office environment.

For 40 years, the arithmometer was the only mechanical calculator available for sale and was sold all over the world. By 1890, about 2,500 arithmometers had been sold plus a few hundreds more from two licensed arithmometer clone makers (Burkhardt, Germany, 1878 and Layton, UK, 1883). Felt and Tarrant, the only other competitor in true commercial production, had sold 100 comptometers in three years. Eventually, the arithmometer was largely replaced by the industrial production of the more successful Odhner Arithmometer in 1890.

The 19th century also saw the designs of Charles Babbage calculating machines, which were too sophisticated to be built in his lifetime, and the dimensions of which required a steam engine to power them, but would lay important groundwork for modern computing. The first was started in 1822: his difference engine, an automatic mechanical calculator. The difference engine could automatically compute and print mathematical tables by continually using the results of the previous operation for the next one.

Baggage then began work on a second device in 1834, his analytical engine, a programmable mechanical calculator. An important feature was the introduction of punched cards to read program and data, derived from the Jacquard loom, allowing more convenient control, reducing error, and making it infinitely programmable. This concept would be essential for the development of the mainframe computers built in the middle of the 20th century. "In less than two years he had sketched out many of the salient features of the modern computer."

In 1855, Georg Scheutz became the first of a handful of designers to succeed at building a smaller and simpler model of Babbage's difference engine.

In 1937, Howard Aiken convinced IBM to design and build the ASCC/Mark I, the first machine of its kind, based on the architecture of the analytical engine; when the machine was finished some hailed it as "Babbage's dream come true".

Desktop Mechanical Calculators in production during the 19th century

=== Desktop calculators produced ===
Front panel of a Thomas Arithmometer with its movable result carriage extended

- In 1851, Thomas de Colmar simplified his arithmometer by removing the one-digit multiplier/divider. This made it a simple adding machine, but thanks to its moving carriage used as an indexed accumulator, it still allowed for easy multiplication and division under operator control. The arithmometer was now adapted to the manufacturing capabilities of the time; Thomas could therefore manufacture consistently a sturdy and reliable machine. Manuals were printed and each machine was given a serial number. Its commercialization launched the mechanical calculator industry. Banks, insurance companies, government offices started to use the arithmometer in their day-to-day operations, slowly bringing mechanical desktop calculators into the office.
- In 1878 Burkhardt, of Germany, was the first to manufacture a clone of Thomas' arithmometer. Until then Thomas de Colmar had been the only manufacturer of desktop mechanical calculators in the world and he had manufactured about 1,500 machines. Eventually twenty European companies will manufacture clones of Thomas' arithmometer until WWII.
- Dorr E. Felt, in the U.S., patented the Comptometer in 1886. It was the first successful key-driven adding and calculating machine. ["Key-driven" refers to the fact that just pressing the keys causes the result to be calculated, no separate lever or crank has to be operated. Other machines are sometimes called "key-set".] In 1887, he joined with Robert Tarrant to form the Felt & Tarrant Manufacturing Company. The comptometer-type calculator was the first machine to receive an all-electronic calculator engine in 1961 (the ANITA mark VII released by Sumlock comptometer of the UK).
- In 1890 W. T. Odhner got the rights to manufacture his calculator back from Königsberger & C, which had held them since it was first patented in 1878, but had not really produced anything. Odhner used his Saint Petersburg workshop to manufacture his calculator and he built and sold 500 machines in 1890. This manufacturing operation shut down definitively in 1918 with 23,000 machines produced. The Odhner Arithmometer was a redesigned version of the Arithmometer of Thomas de Colmar with a pinwheel engine, which made it cheaper to manufacture and gave it a smaller footprint while keeping the advantage of having the same user interface.
- In 1892 Odhner sold the Berlin branch of his factory, which he had opened a year earlier, to Grimme, Natalis & Co. They moved the factory to Braunschweig and sold their machines under the brand name of Brunsviga (Brunsviga is the Latin name of the town of Braunschweig). This was the first of many companies which would sell and manufacture clones of Odhner's machine all over the world; eventually millions were sold well into the 1970s.
- In 1892, William S. Burroughs began commercial manufacture of his printing adding calculator. Burroughs Corporation became one of the leading companies in the accounting machine and computer businesses.
- The "Millionaire" calculator was introduced in 1893. It allowed direct multiplication by any digit – "one turn of the crank for each figure in the multiplier". It contained a mechanical product lookup table, providing units and tens digits by differing lengths of posts. Another direct multiplier was part of the Moon-Hopkins billing machine; that company was acquired by Burroughs in the early 20th century.

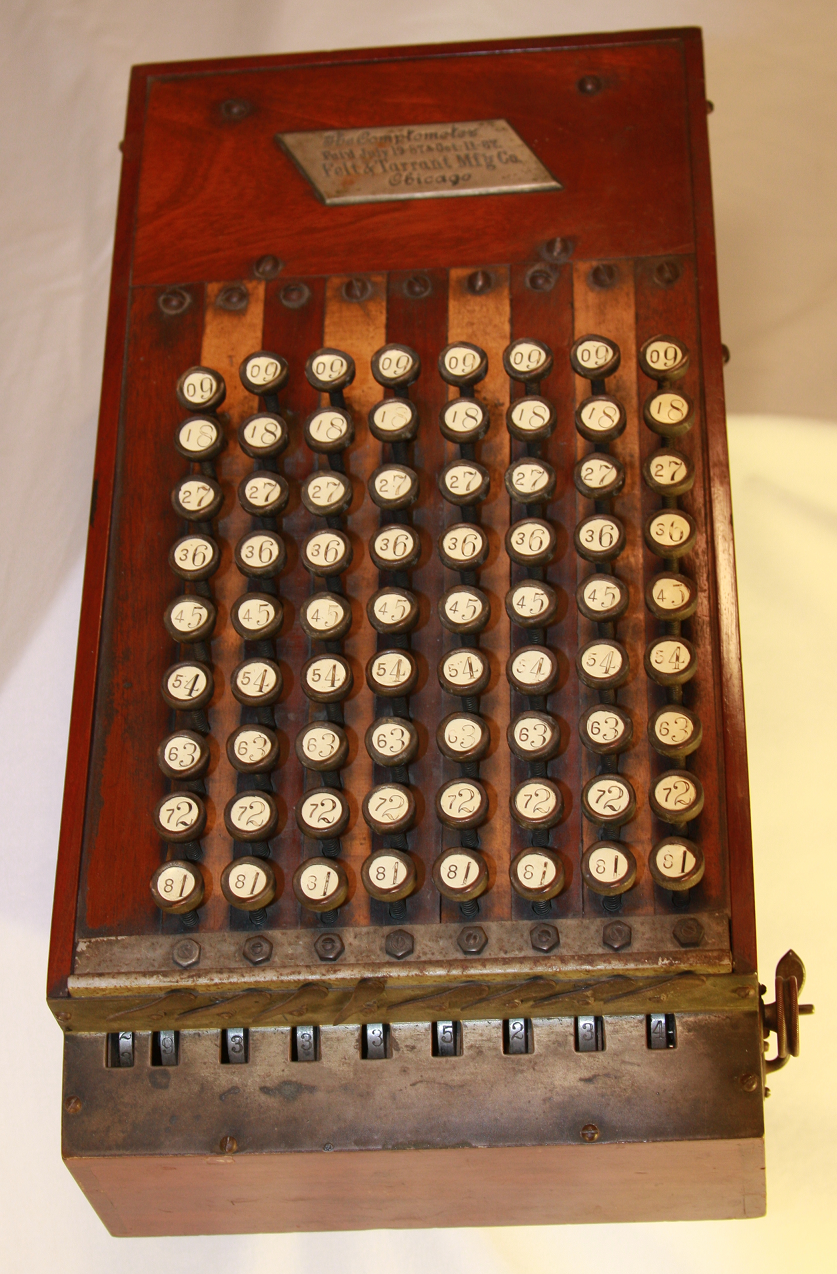
19th century Comptometer in a wooden case

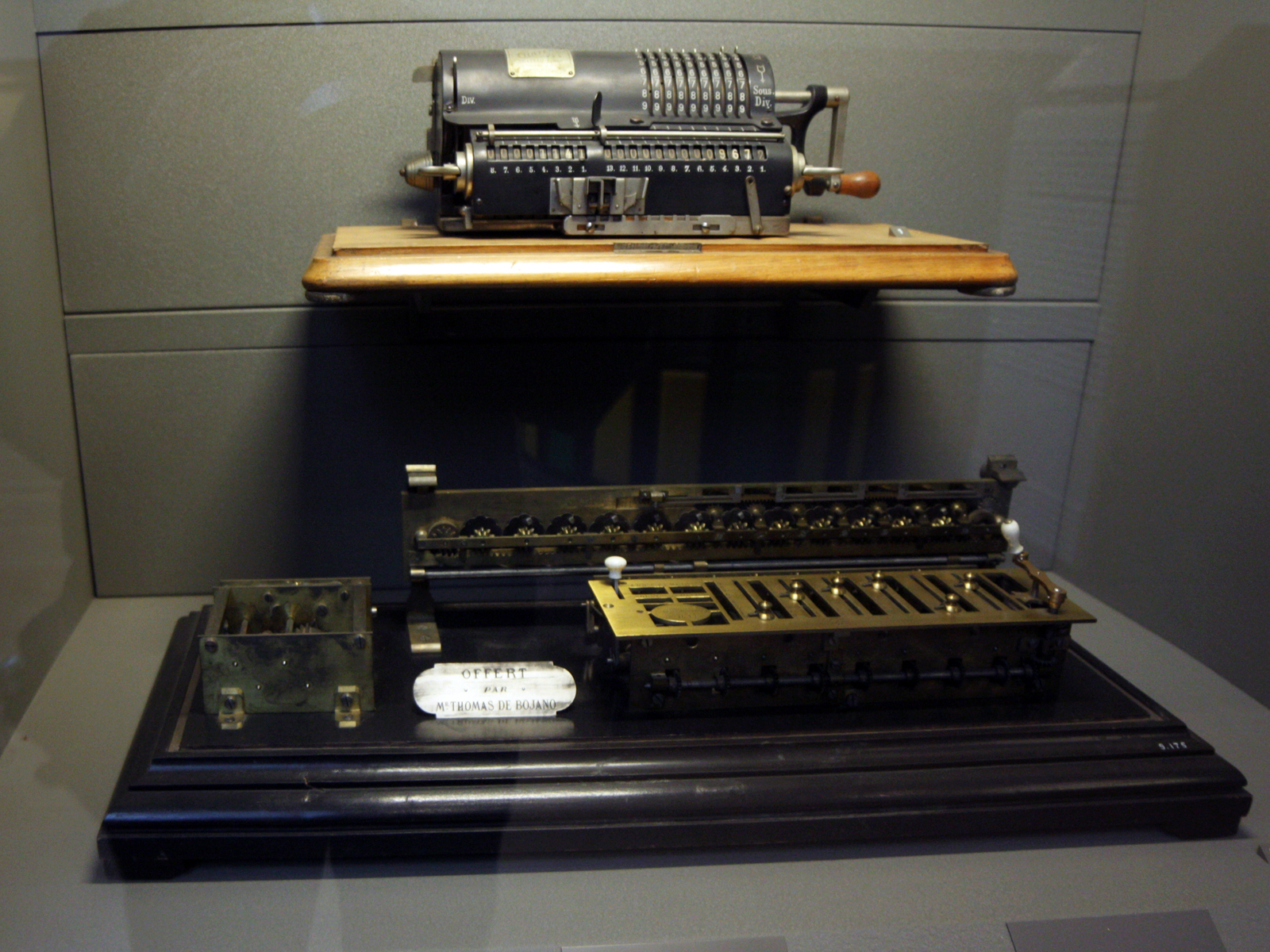
19th and early 20th centuries calculating machines, Musée des Arts et Métiers

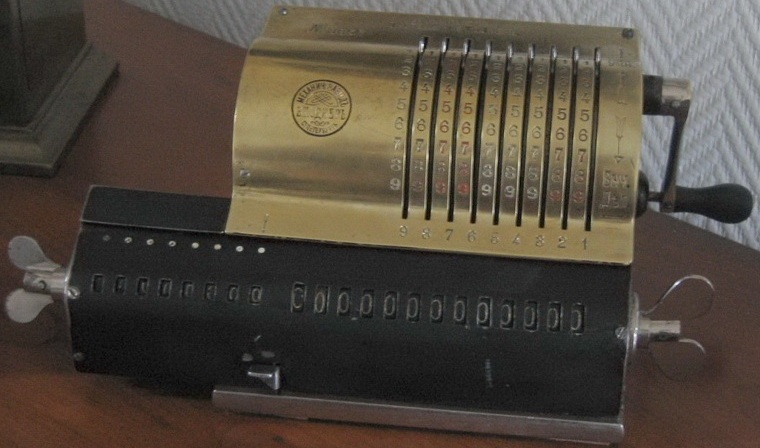
Odhner's arithmometer

=== Automatic mechanical calculators ===
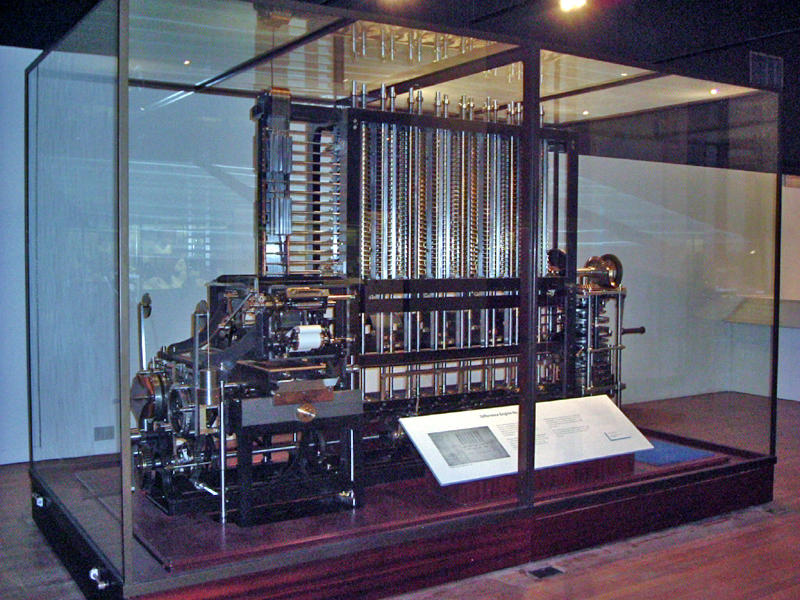
The London Science Museum's working difference engine, built a century and a half after Charles Babbage's design.

- In 1822, Charles Babbage presented a small cogwheel assembly that demonstrated the operation of his difference engine, a mechanical calculator which would be capable of holding and manipulating seven numbers of 31 decimal digits each. It was the first time that a calculating machine could work automatically using as input results from its previous operations. It was the first calculating machine to use a printer. The development of this machine, later called "Difference Engine No. 1," stopped around 1834.
- In 1847, Babbage began work on an improved difference engine design—his "Difference Engine No. 2." None of these designs were completely built by Babbage. In 1991 the London Science Museum followed Babbage's plans to build a working Difference Engine No. 2 using the technology and materials available in the 19th century.
- In 1855, Per Georg Scheutz completed a working difference engine based on Babbage's design. The machine was the size of a piano, and was demonstrated at the Exposition Universelle in Paris in 1855. It was used to create tables of logarithms.
- In 1875, Martin Wiberg re-designed the Babbage/Scheutz difference engine and built a version that was the size of a sewing machine.

=== Programmable mechanical calculators ===
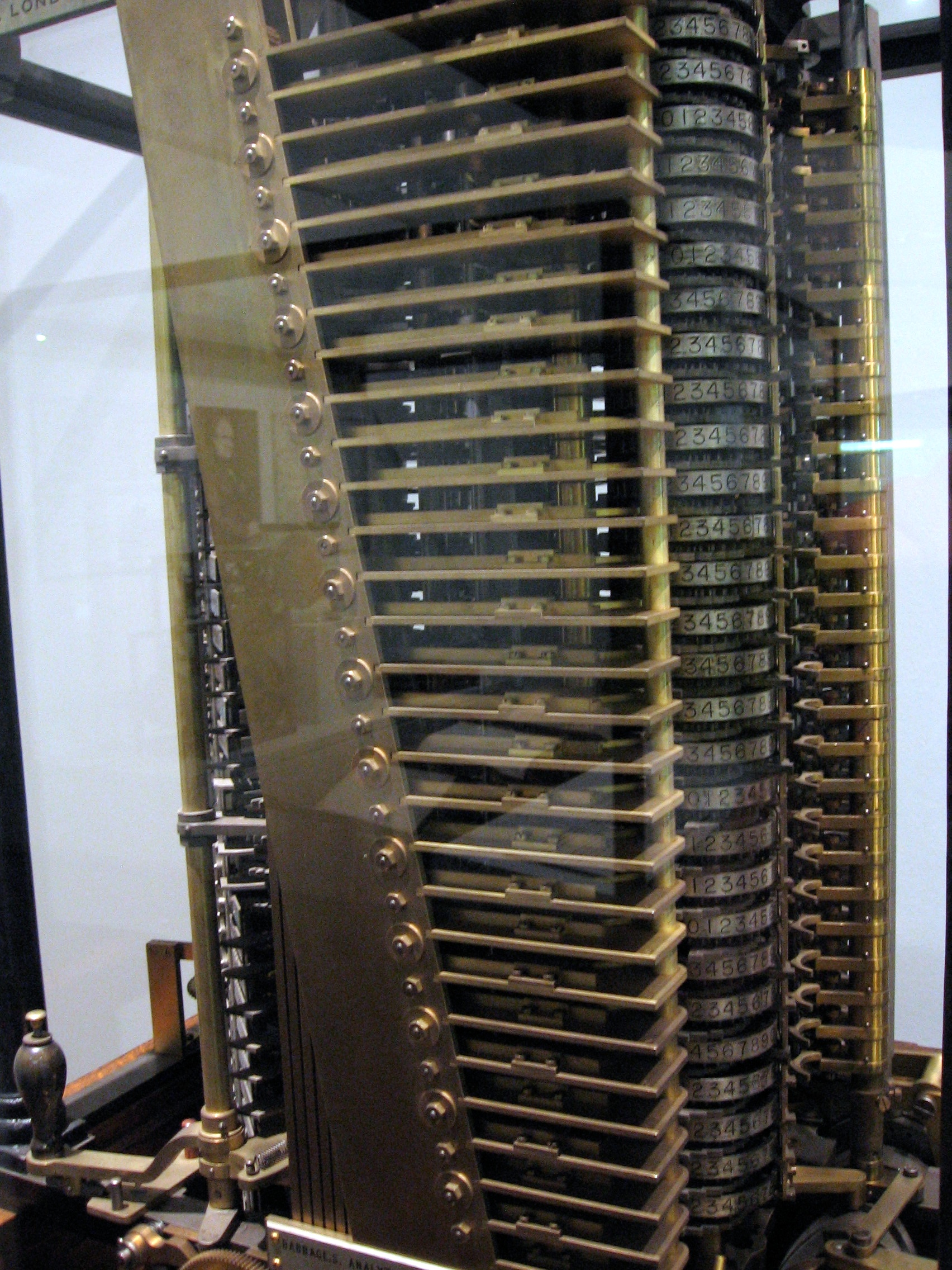
Minimal but working demonstration part of the mill from the Analytical engine, finished by Babbage's son around 1906

- In 1834, Babbage started to design his analytical engine, which will become the undisputed ancestor of the modern mainframe computer with two separate input streams for data and program (a primitive Harvard architecture), printers for outputting results (three different kind), processing unit (mill), memory (store) and the first-ever set of programming instructions. In the proposal that Howard Aiken gave IBM in 1937 while requesting funding for the Harvard Mark I which became IBM's entry machine in the computer industry, we can read: "Few calculating machines have been designed strictly for application to scientific investigations, the notable exceptions being those of Charles Babbage and others who followed him. In 1812 Babbage conceived the idea of a calculating machine of a higher type than those previously constructed to be used for calculating and printing tables of mathematical functions. ....After abandoning the difference engine, Babbage devoted his energy to the design and construction of an analytical engine of far higher powers than the difference engine..."
- In 1843, during the translation of a French article on the analytical engine, Ada Lovelace wrote, in one of the many notes she included, an algorithm to compute the Bernoulli numbers. This is considered the first computer program.
- From 1872 until 1910, Henry Babbage worked intermittently on creating the mill, the "central processing unit" of his father's machine. After a few setbacks, he gave in 1906 a successful demonstration of the mill which printed the first 44 multiples of pi with 29 places of figures.

=== Cash registers ===
The cash register, invented by the American saloonkeeper James Ritty in 1879, addressed the old problems of disorganization and dishonesty in business transactions. It was a pure adding machine coupled with a printer, a bell and a two-sided display that showed the paying party and the store owner, if he wanted to, the amount of money exchanged for the current transaction.

The cash register was easy to use and, unlike genuine mechanical calculators, was needed and quickly adopted by a great number of businesses. "Eighty four companies sold cash registers between 1888 and 1895, only three survived for any length of time".

In 1890, 6 years after John Patterson started NCR Corporation, 20,000 machines had been sold by his company alone against a total of roughly 3,500 for all genuine calculators combined.

By 1900, NCR had built 200,000 cash registers and there were more companies manufacturing them, compared to the "Thomas/Payen" arithmometer company that had just sold around 3,300 and Burroughs had only sold 1,400 machines.

=== Prototypes and limited runs ===
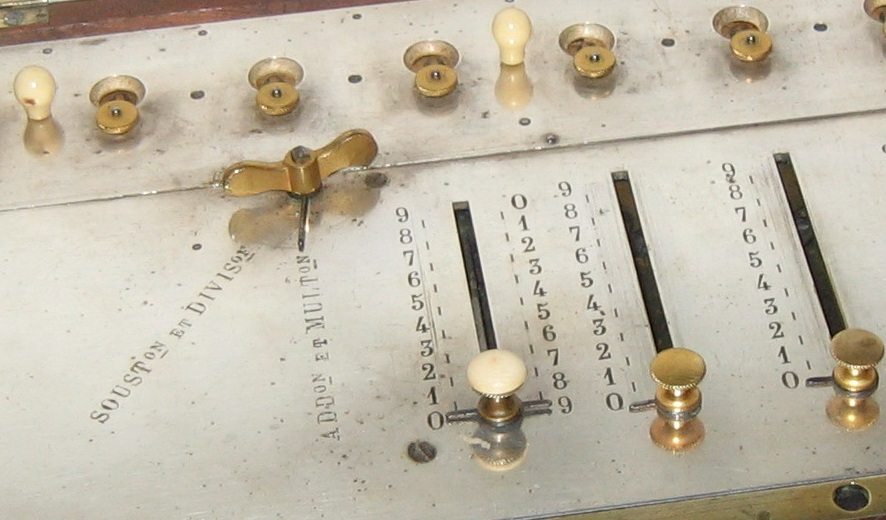
Arithmometers built from 1820 to 1851 had a one-digit multiplier/divider cursor (ivory top) is on the left. Only prototypes of these machines were built.

- In 1820, Thomas de Colmar patented the Arithmometer. It was a true four operation machine with a one digit multiplier/divider (The Millionaire calculator released 70 years later had a similar user interface). He spent the next 30 years and 300,000 Francs developing his machine. This design was replaced in 1851 by the simplified arithmometer which was only an adding machine.
- From 1840, Didier Roth patented and built a few calculating machines, one of which was a direct descendant of Pascal's calculator.
- In 1842, Timoleon Maurel invented the Arithmaurel, based on the Arithmometer, which could multiply two numbers by simply entering their values into the machine.
- In 1845, Izrael Abraham Staffel first exhibited a machine that was able to add, subtract, divide, multiply and obtain a square root.
- Around 1854, Andre-Michel Guerry invented the Ordonnateur Statistique, a cylindrical device designed to aid in summarizing the relations among data on moral variables (crime, suicide, etc.)
- In 1872, Frank S. Baldwin in the U.S. invented a pinwheel calculator.
- In 1877 George B. Grant of Boston in the United States began producing the Grant mechanical calculating machine capable of addition, subtraction, multiplication and division. The machine measured 13x5x7 inches and contained eighty working pieces made of brass and tempered steel. It was first introduced to the public at the 1876 Centennial Exposition in Philadelphia.
- In 1883, Edmondson of the United Kingdom patented a circular stepped drum calculator.

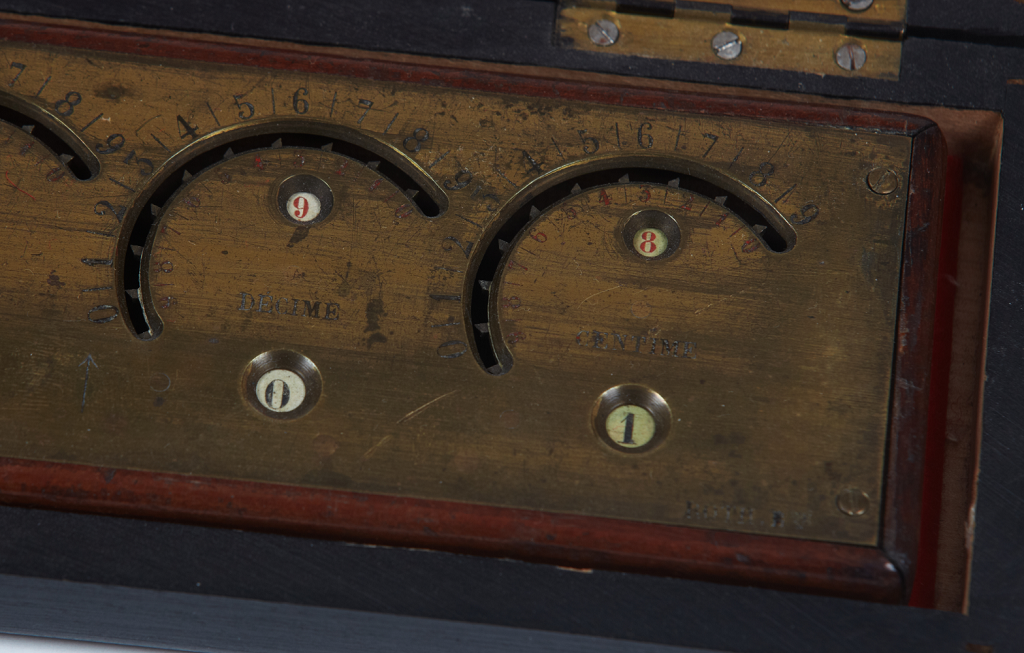
Detail of an early calculating machine invented by Didier Roth around 1840. This machine is a direct descendant of Pascal's calculator.

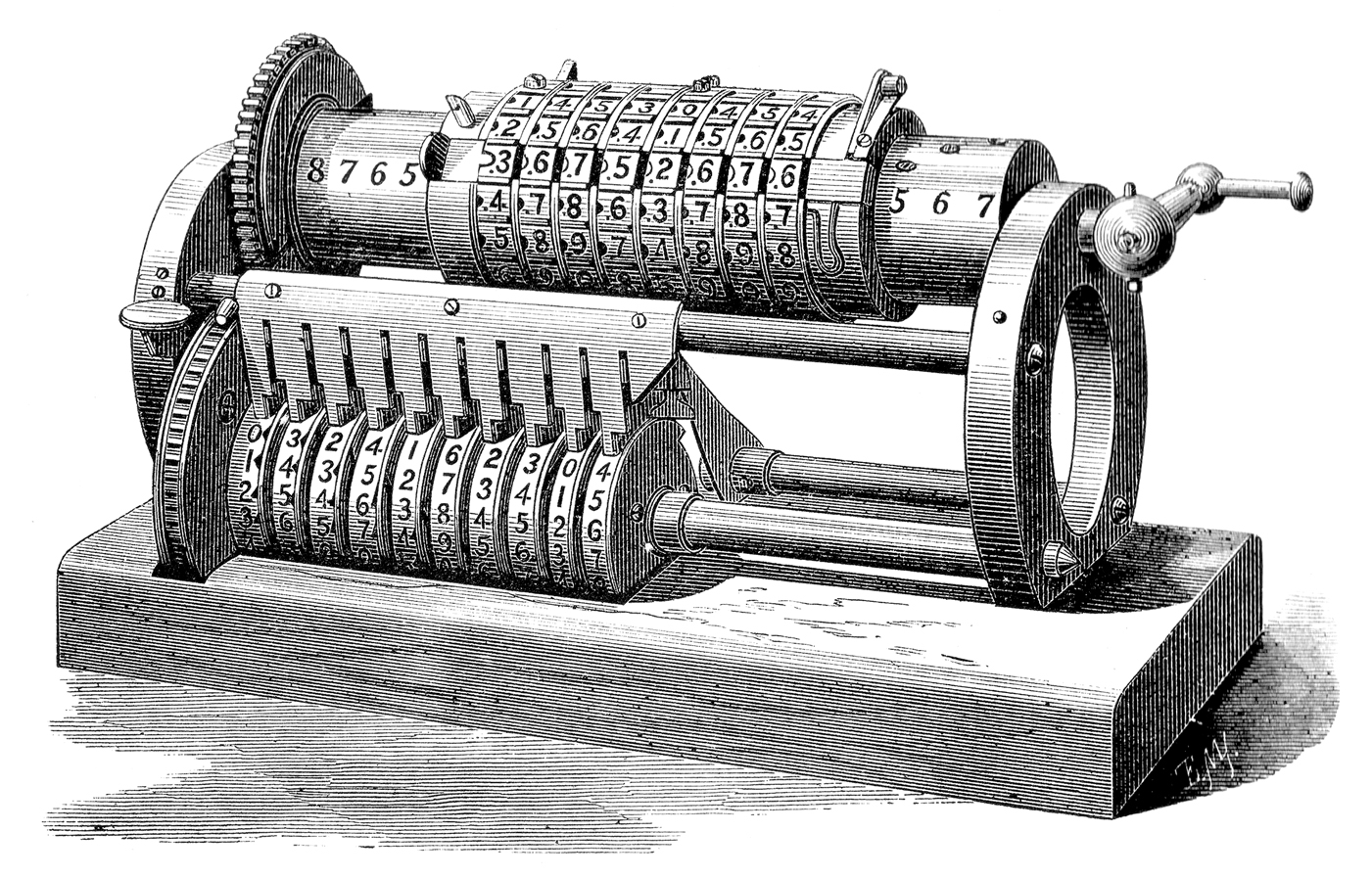
Grant's Barrel, 1877

== 1900s to 1970s ==
=== Mechanical calculators reach their zenith ===
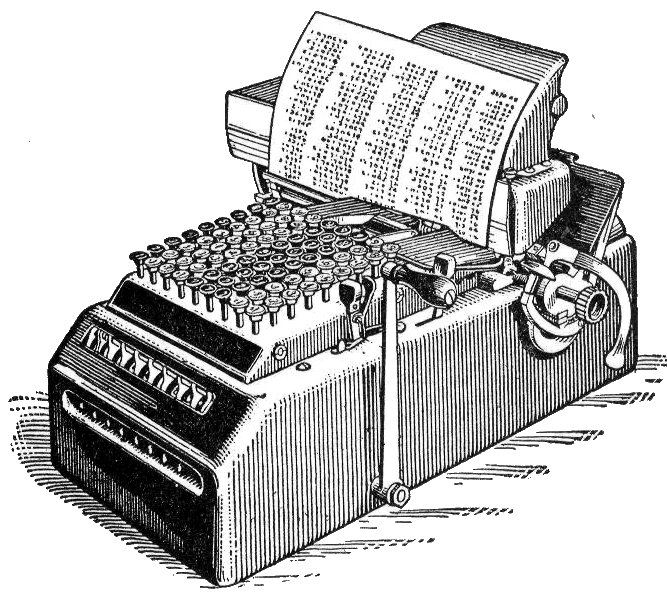
Mechanical calculator from 1914

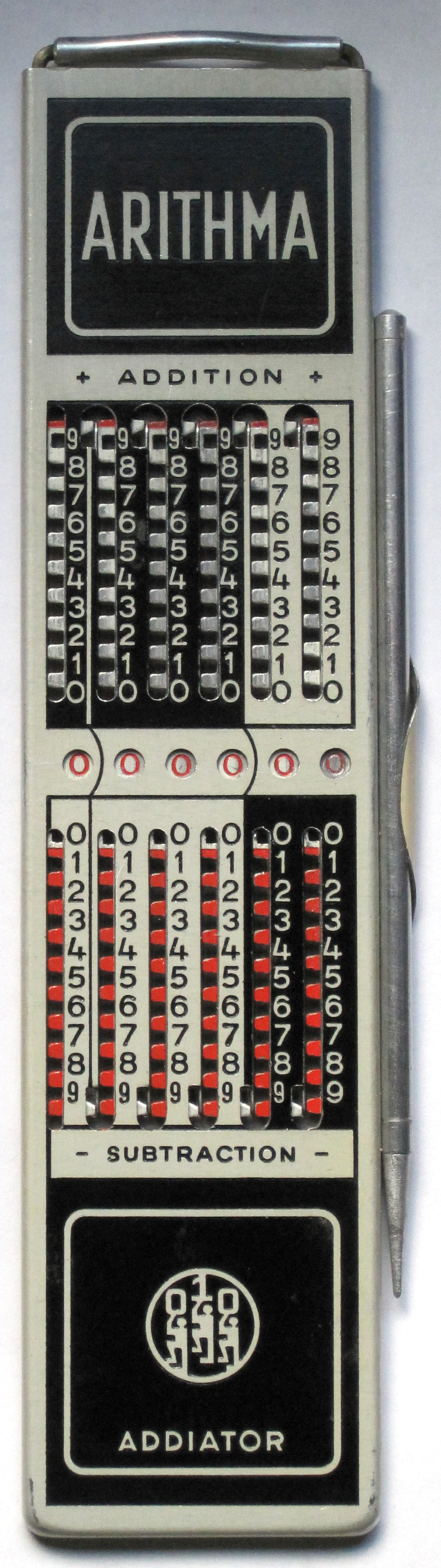
An Addiator can be used for addition and subtraction.

Two different classes of mechanisms had become established by this time, reciprocating and rotary. The former type of mechanism was operated typically by a limited-travel hand crank; some internal detailed operations took place on the pull, and others on the release part of a complete cycle. The illustrated 1914 machine is this type; the crank is vertical, on its right side. Later on, some of these mechanisms were operated by electric motors and reduction gearing that operated a crank and connecting rod to convert rotary motion to reciprocating.

The latter type, rotary, had at least one main shaft that made one [or more] continuous revolution[s], one addition or subtraction per turn. Numerous designs, notably European calculators, had handcranks, and locks to ensure that the cranks were returned to exact positions once a turn was complete.

The first half of the 20th century saw the gradual development of the mechanical calculator mechanism.

The Dalton adding-listing machine introduced in 1902 was the first of its type to use only ten keys, and became the first of many different models of "10-key add-listers" manufactured by many companies.

In 1948 the cylindrical Curta calculator, which was compact enough to be held in one hand, was introduced after being developed by Curt Herzstark in 1938. This was an extreme development of the stepped-gear calculating mechanism. It subtracted by adding complements; between the teeth for addition were teeth for subtraction.

From the early 1900s through the 1960s, mechanical calculators dominated the desktop computing market. Major suppliers in the USA included Friden, Monroe, and SCM/Marchant. These devices were motor-driven, and had movable carriages where results of calculations were displayed by dials. Nearly all keyboards were full – each digit that could be entered had its own column of nine keys, 1..9, plus a column-clear key, permitting entry of several digits at once. (See the illustration below of a Marchant Figurematic.) One could call this parallel entry, by way of contrast with ten-key serial entry that was commonplace in mechanical adding machines, and is now universal in electronic calculators. (Nearly all Friden calculators, as well as some rotary (German) Diehls had a ten-key auxiliary keyboard for entering the multiplier when doing multiplication.) Full keyboards generally had ten columns, although some lower-cost machines had eight. Most machines made by the three companies mentioned did not print their results, although other companies, such as Olivetti, did make printing calculators.

In these machines, addition and subtraction were performed in a single operation, as on a conventional adding machine, but multiplication and division were accomplished by repeated mechanical additions and subtractions. Friden made a calculator that also provided square roots, basically by doing division, but with added mechanism that automatically incremented the number in the keyboard in a systematic fashion. The last of the mechanical calculators were likely to have short-cut multiplication, and some ten-key, serial-entry types had decimal-point keys. However, decimal-point keys required significant internal added complexity, and were offered only in the last designs to be made. Handheld mechanical calculators such as the 1948 Curta continued to be used until they were displaced by electronic calculators in the 1970s.

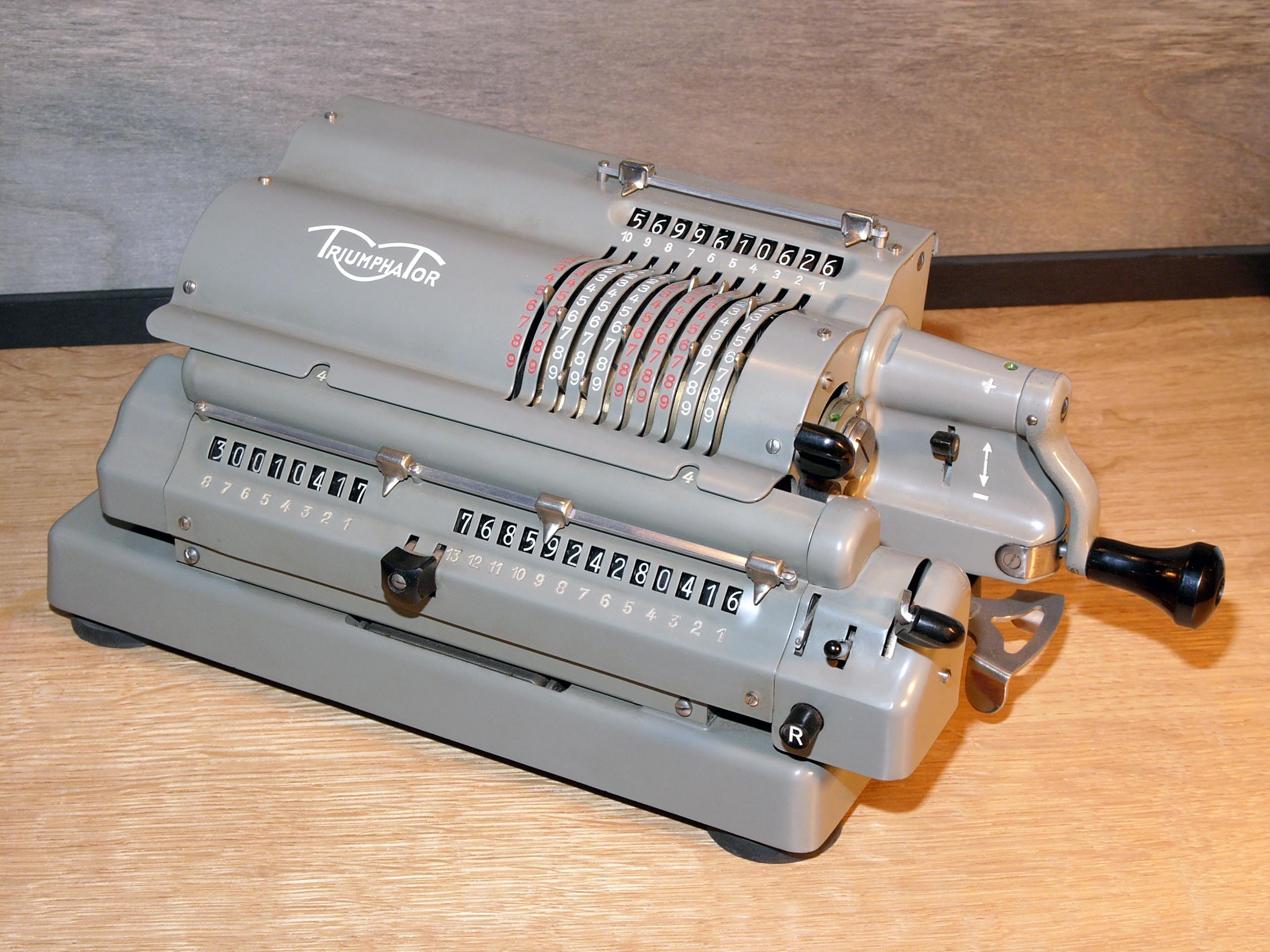
Triumphator CRN1 (1958)

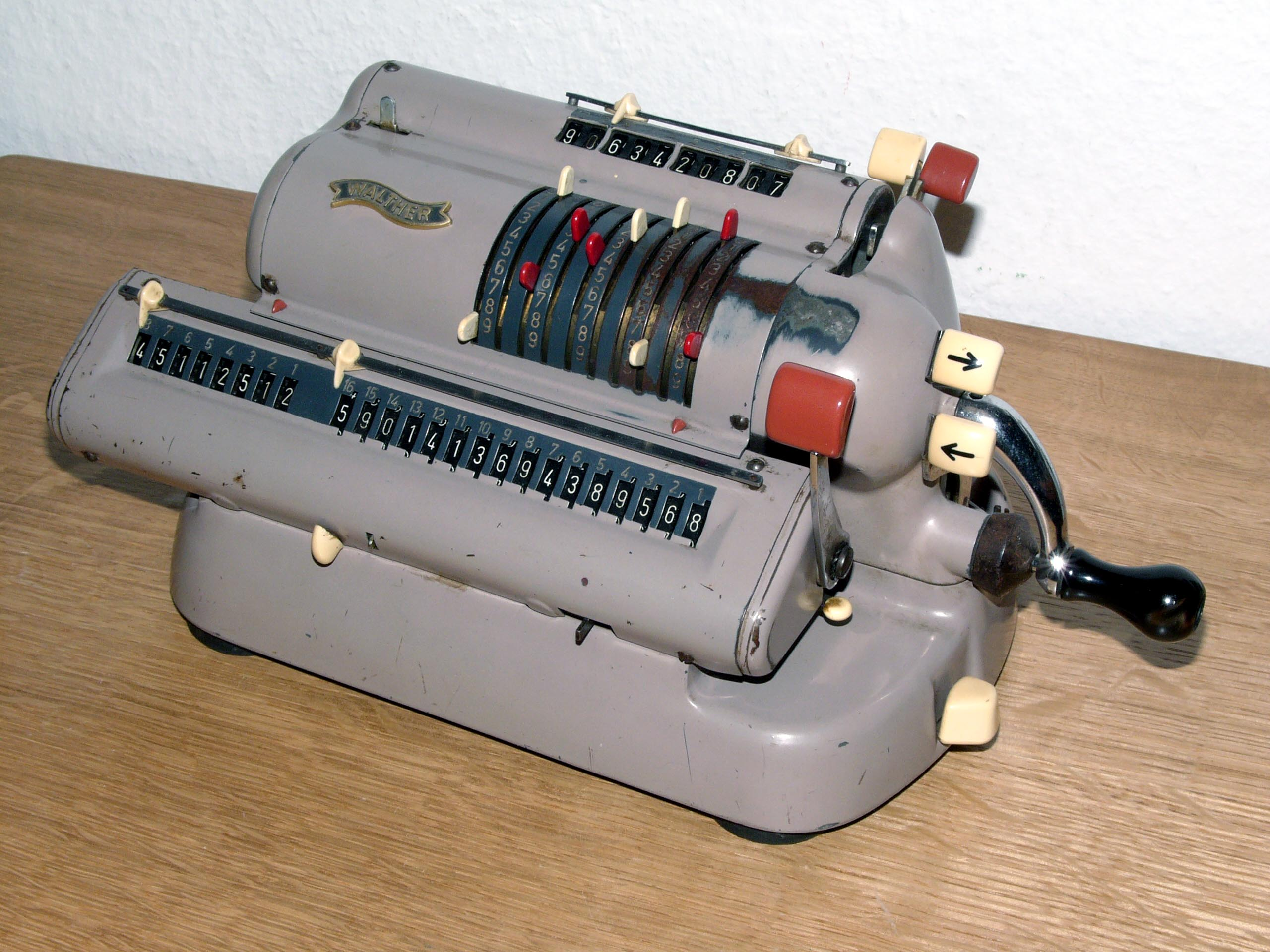
Walther WSR160 (one of the most common calculators in central Europe) (1960)

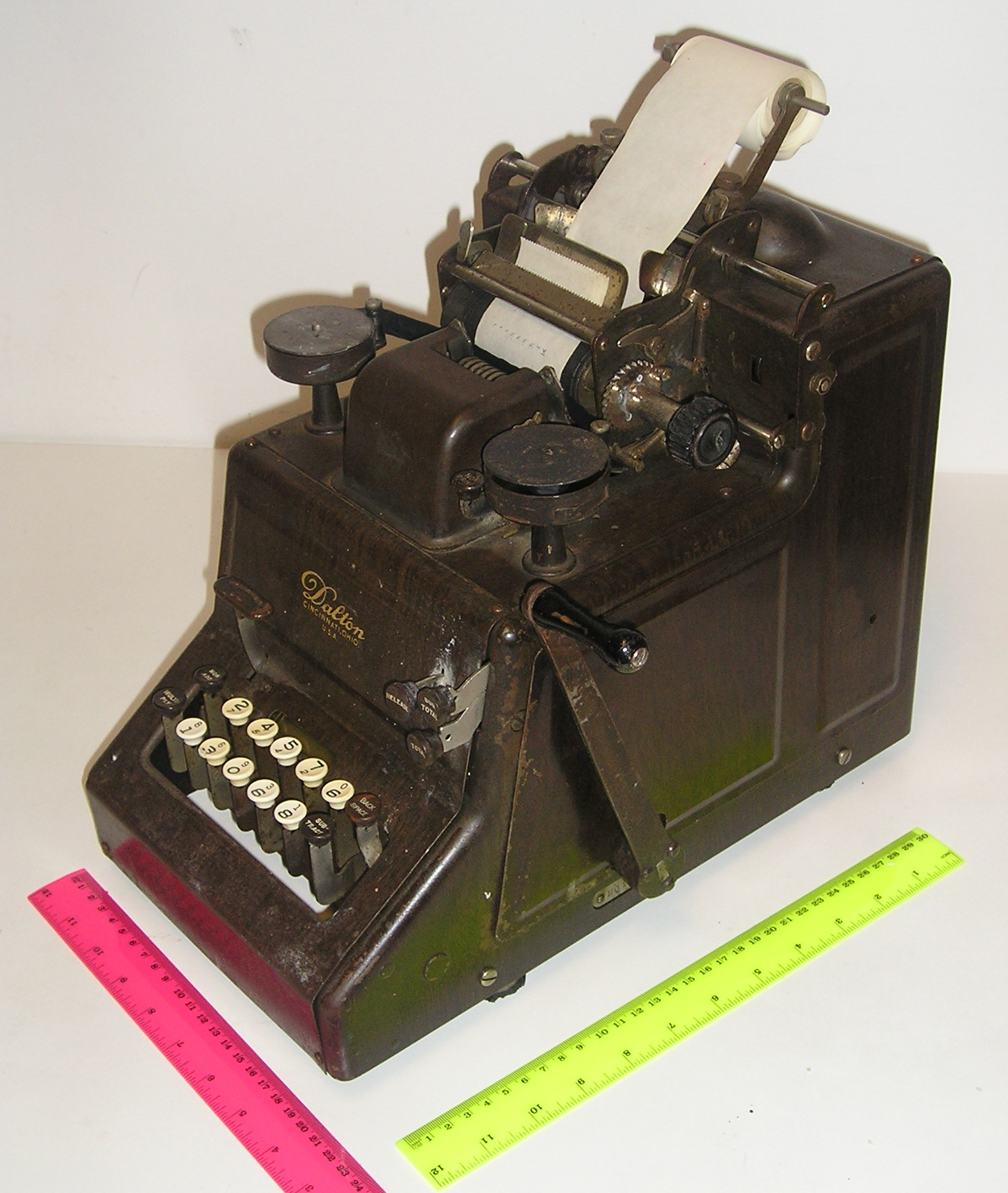
Dalton adding machine (ca. 1930)

Mechanism of mechanical calculator

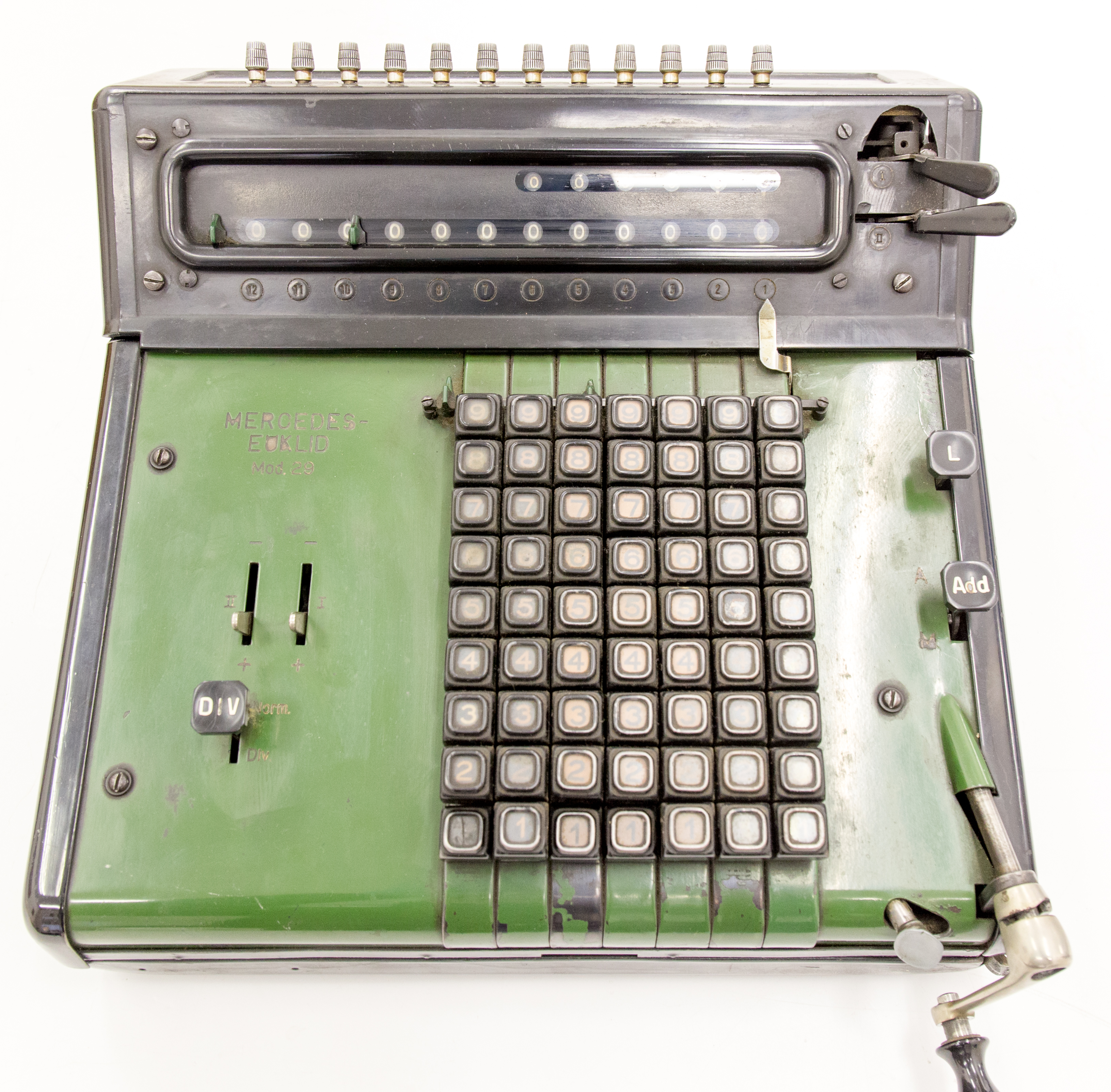
Mercedes Euklidische, Mod. 29 at the Museum Europäischer Kulturen

Typical European four-operation machines use the Odhner mechanism, or variations of it. This kind of machine included the Original Odhner, Brunsviga and several following imitators, starting from Triumphator, Thales, Walther, Facit up to Toshiba. Although most of these were operated by handcranks, there were motor-driven versions. Hamann calculators externally resembled pinwheel machines, but the setting lever positioned a cam that disengaged a drive pawl when the dial had moved far enough.

Although Dalton introduced in 1902 first 10-key printing adding (two operations, the other being subtraction) machine, these features were not present in computing (four operations) machines for many decades. Facit-T (1932) was the first 10-key computing machine sold in large numbers. Olivetti Divisumma-14 (1948) was the first computing machine with both printer and a 10-key keyboard.

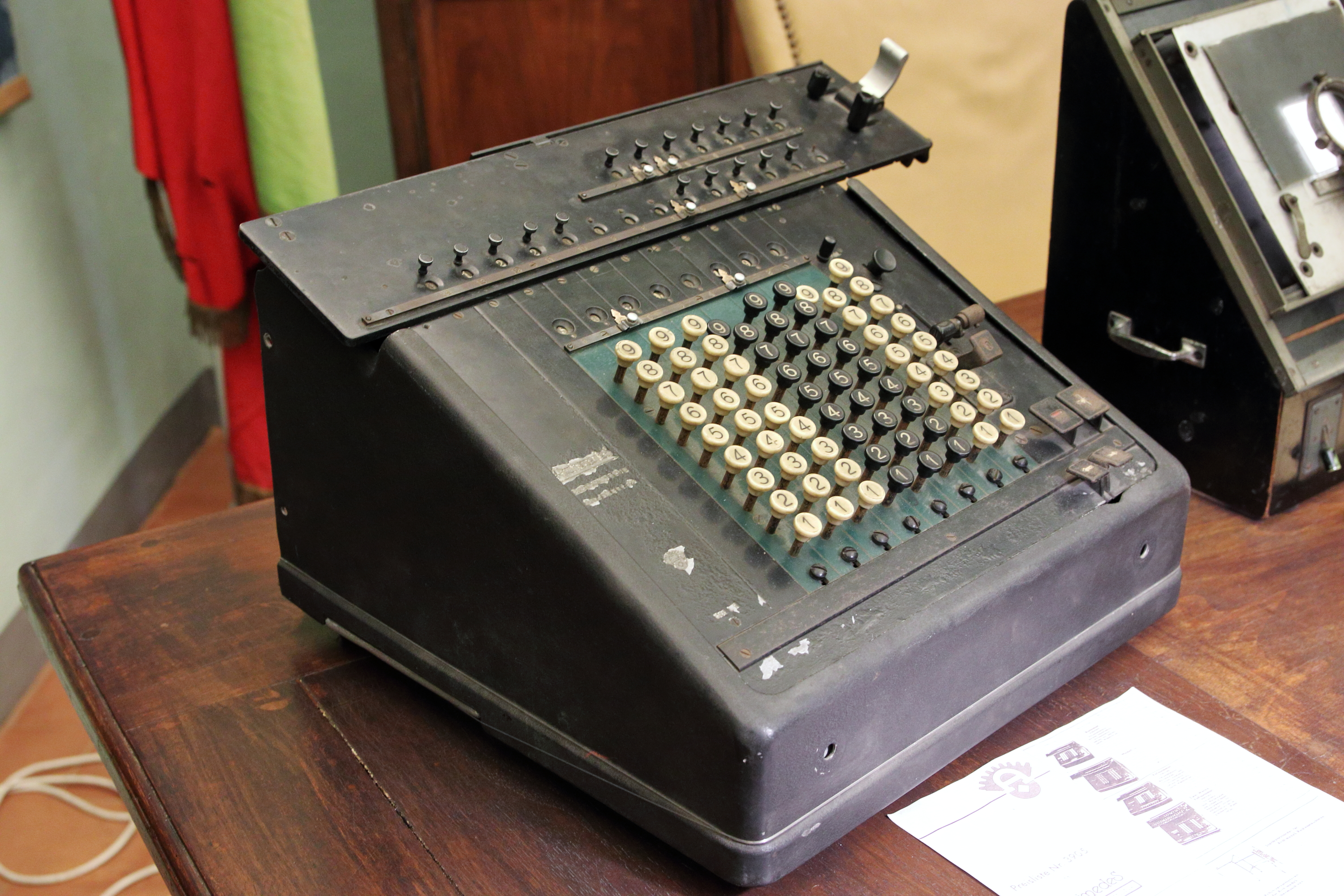
Archimedes LK 14, an electro-mechanical calculator exposed at the Specola Museum in Bologna, Italy

Full-keyboard machines, including motor-driven ones, were also built until the 1960s. Among the major manufacturers were Mercedes-Euklid, Archimedes, and MADAS in Europe; in the USA, Friden, Marchant, and Monroe were the principal makers of rotary calculators with carriages. Reciprocating calculators (most of which were adding machines, many with integral printers) were made by Remington Rand and Burroughs, among others. All of these were key-set. Felt & Tarrant made Comptometers, as well as Victor, which were key-driven.

The basic mechanism of the Friden and Monroe was a modified Leibniz wheel (better known, perhaps informally, in the USA as a "stepped drum" or "stepped reckoner"). The Friden had an elementary reversing drive between the body of the machine and the accumulator dials, so its main shaft always rotated in the same direction. The Swiss MADAS was similar. The Monroe, however, reversed direction of its main shaft to subtract.

The earliest Marchants were pinwheel machines, but most of them were remarkably sophisticated rotary types. They ran at 1,300 addition cycles per minute if the [+] bar is held down. Others were limited to 600 cycles per minute, because their accumulator dials started and stopped for every cycle; Marchant dials moved at a steady and proportional speed for continuing cycles. Most Marchants had a row of nine keys on the extreme right, as shown in the photo of the Figurematic. These simply made the machine add for the number of cycles corresponding to the number on the key, and then shifted the carriage one place. Even nine add cycles took only a short time.

In a Marchant, near the beginning of a cycle, the accumulator dials moved downward "into the dip", away from the openings in the cover. They engaged drive gears in the body of the machine, which rotated them at speeds proportional to the digit being fed to them, with added movement (reduced 10:1) from carries created by dials to their right. At the completion of the cycle, the dials would be misaligned like the pointers in a traditional watt-hour meter. However, as they came up out of the dip, a constant-lead disc cam realigned them by way of a (limited-travel) spur-gear differential. As well, carries for lower orders were added in by another, planetary differential. (The machine shown has 39 differentials in its [20-digit] accumulator!)

In any mechanical calculator, in effect, a gear, sector, or some similar device moves the accumulator by the number of gear teeth that corresponds to the digit being added or subtracted – three teeth changes the position by a count of three. The great majority of basic calculator mechanisms move the accumulator by starting, then moving at a constant speed, and stopping. In particular, stopping is critical, because to obtain fast operation, the accumulator needs to move quickly. Variants of Geneva drives typically block overshoot (which, of course, would create wrong results).

However, two different basic mechanisms, the Mercedes-Euklid and the Marchant, move the dials at speeds corresponding to the digit being added or subtracted; a [1] moves the accumulator the slowest, and a [9], the fastest. In the Mercedes-Euklid, a long slotted lever, pivoted at one end, moves nine racks ("straight gears") endwise by distances proportional to their distance from the lever's pivot. Each rack has a drive pin that is moved by the slot. The rack for [1] is closest to the pivot, of course. For each keyboard digit, a sliding selector gear, much like that in the Leibniz wheel, engages the rack that corresponds to the digit entered. Of course, the accumulator changes either on the forward or reverse stroke, but not both. This mechanism is notably simple and relatively easy to manufacture.

The Marchant, however, has, for every one of its ten columns of keys, a nine-ratio "preselector transmission" with its output spur gear at the top of the machine's body; that gear engages the accumulator gearing. When one tries to work out the numbers of teeth in such a transmission, a straightforward approach leads one to consider a mechanism like that in mechanical gasoline pump registers, used to indicate the total price. However, this mechanism is seriously bulky, and utterly impractical for a calculator; 90-tooth gears are likely to be found in the gas pump. Practical gears in the computing parts of a calculator cannot have 90 teeth. They would be either too big, or too delicate.

Given that nine ratios per column implies significant complexity, a Marchant contains a few hundred individual gears in all, many in its accumulator. Basically, the accumulator dial has to rotate 36 degrees (1/10 of a turn) for a [1], and 324 degrees (9/10 of a turn) for a [9], not allowing for incoming carries. At some point in the gearing, one tooth needs to pass for a [1], and nine teeth for a [9]. There is no way to develop the needed movement from a driveshaft that rotates one revolution per cycle with few gears having practical (relatively small) numbers of teeth.

The Marchant, therefore, has three driveshafts to feed the little transmissions. For one cycle, they rotate 1/2, 1/4, and 1/12 of a revolution. . The 1/2-turn shaft carries (for each column) gears with 12, 14, 16, and 18 teeth, corresponding to digits 6, 7, 8, and 9. The 1/4-turn shaft carries (also, each column) gears with 12, 16, and 20 teeth, for 3, 4, and 5. Digits [1] and [2] are handled by 12 and 24-tooth gears on the 1/12-revolution shaft. Practical design places the 12th-rev. shaft more distant, so the 1/4-turn shaft carries freely-rotating 24 and 12-tooth idler gears. For subtraction, the driveshafts reversed direction.

In the early part of the cycle, one of five pendants moves off-center to engage the appropriate drive gear for the selected digit.

Some machines had as many as 20 columns in their full keyboards. The monster in this field was the Duodecillion made by Burroughs for exhibit purposes.

For sterling currency, £/s/d (and even farthings), there were variations of the basic mechanisms, in particular with different numbers of gear teeth and accumulator dial positions. To accommodate shillings and pence, extra columns were added for the tens digit[s], 10 and 20 for shillings, and 10 for pence. Of course, these functioned as radix-20 and radix-12 mechanisms.

A variant of the Marchant, called the Binary-Octal Marchant, was a radix-8 (octal) machine. It was sold to check very early vacuum-tube (valve) binary computers for accuracy. (Back then, the mechanical calculator was much more reliable than a tube/valve computer.)

As well, there was a twin Marchant, comprising two pinwheel Marchants with a common drive crank and reversing gearbox. Twin machines were relatively rare, and apparently were used for surveying calculations. At least one triple machine was made.

The Facit calculator, and one similar to it, are basically pinwheel machines, but the array of pinwheels moves sidewise, instead of the carriage. The pinwheels are biquinary; digits 1 through 4 cause the corresponding number of sliding pins to extend from the surface; digits 5 through 9 also extend a five-tooth sector as well as the same pins for 6 through 9.

The keys operate cams that operate a swinging lever to first unlock the pin-positioning cam that is part of the pinwheel mechanism; further movement of the lever (by an amount determined by the key's cam) rotates the pin-positioning cam to extend the necessary number of pins.

Stylus-operated adders with circular slots for the stylus, and side-by -side wheels, as made by Sterling Plastics (USA), had an ingenious anti-overshoot mechanism to ensure accurate carries.

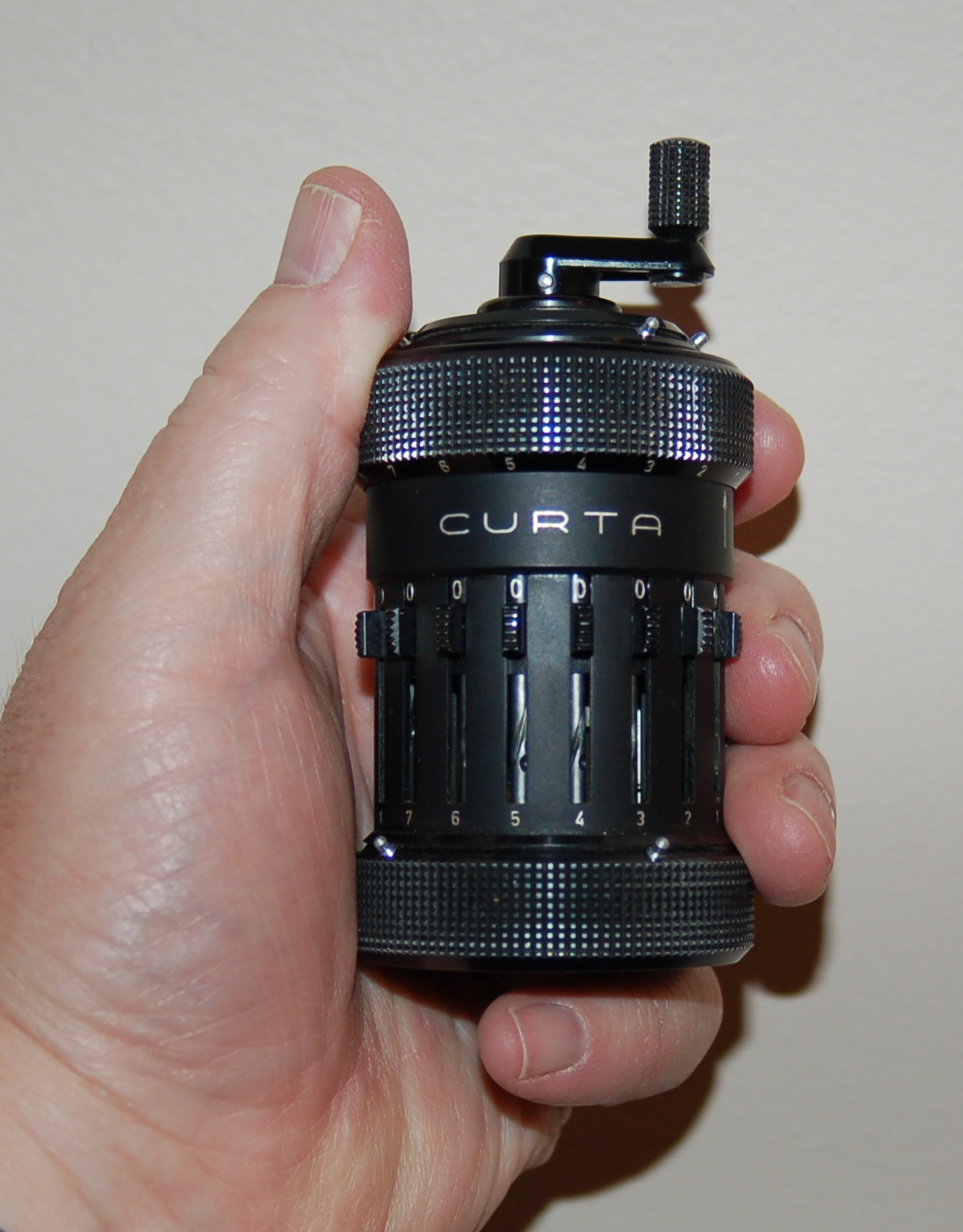
Curta Type I

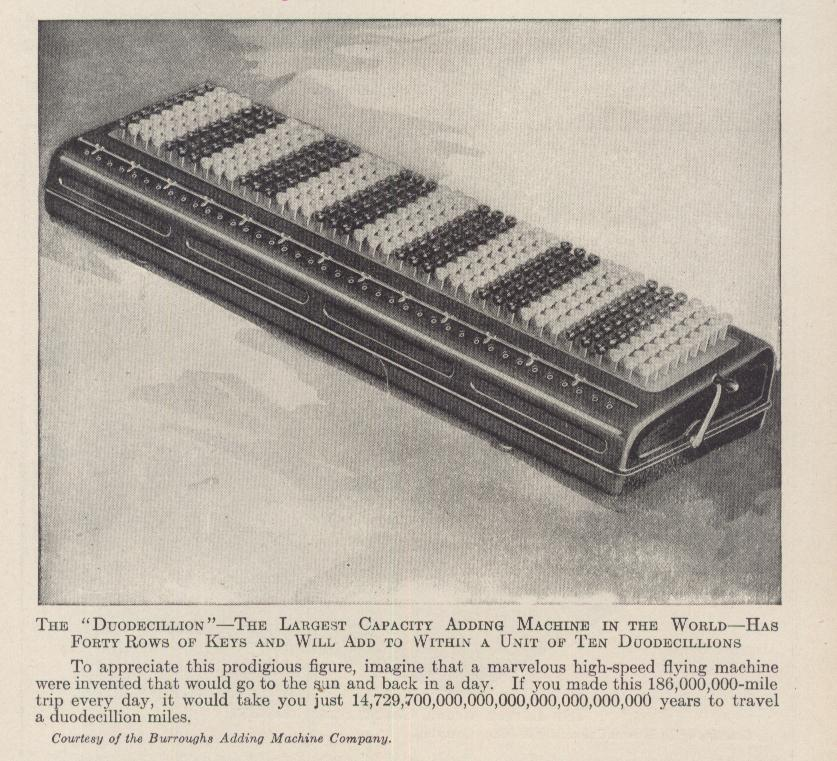
Duodecillion (ca. 1915)

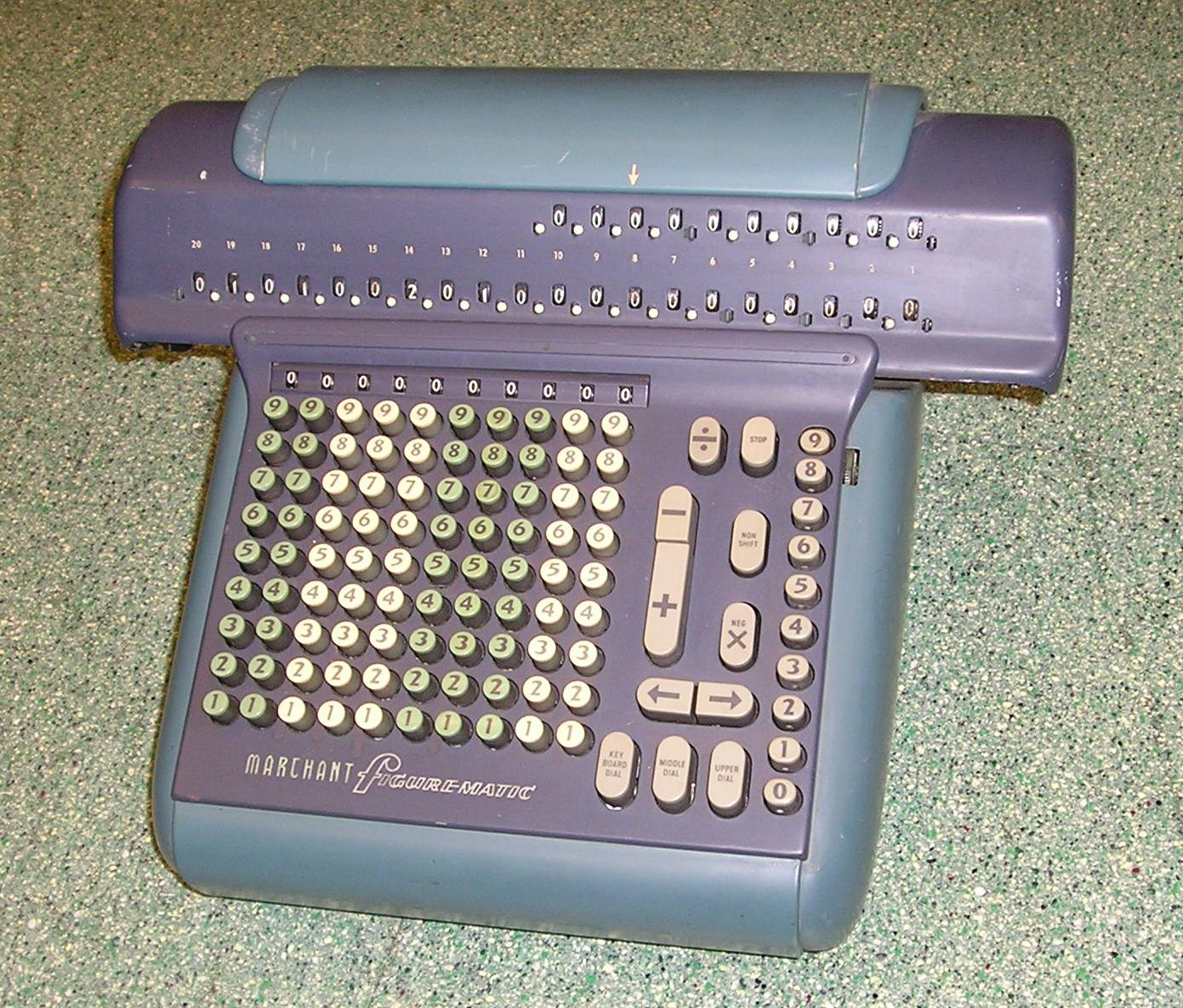
Marchant Figurematic (1950–52)

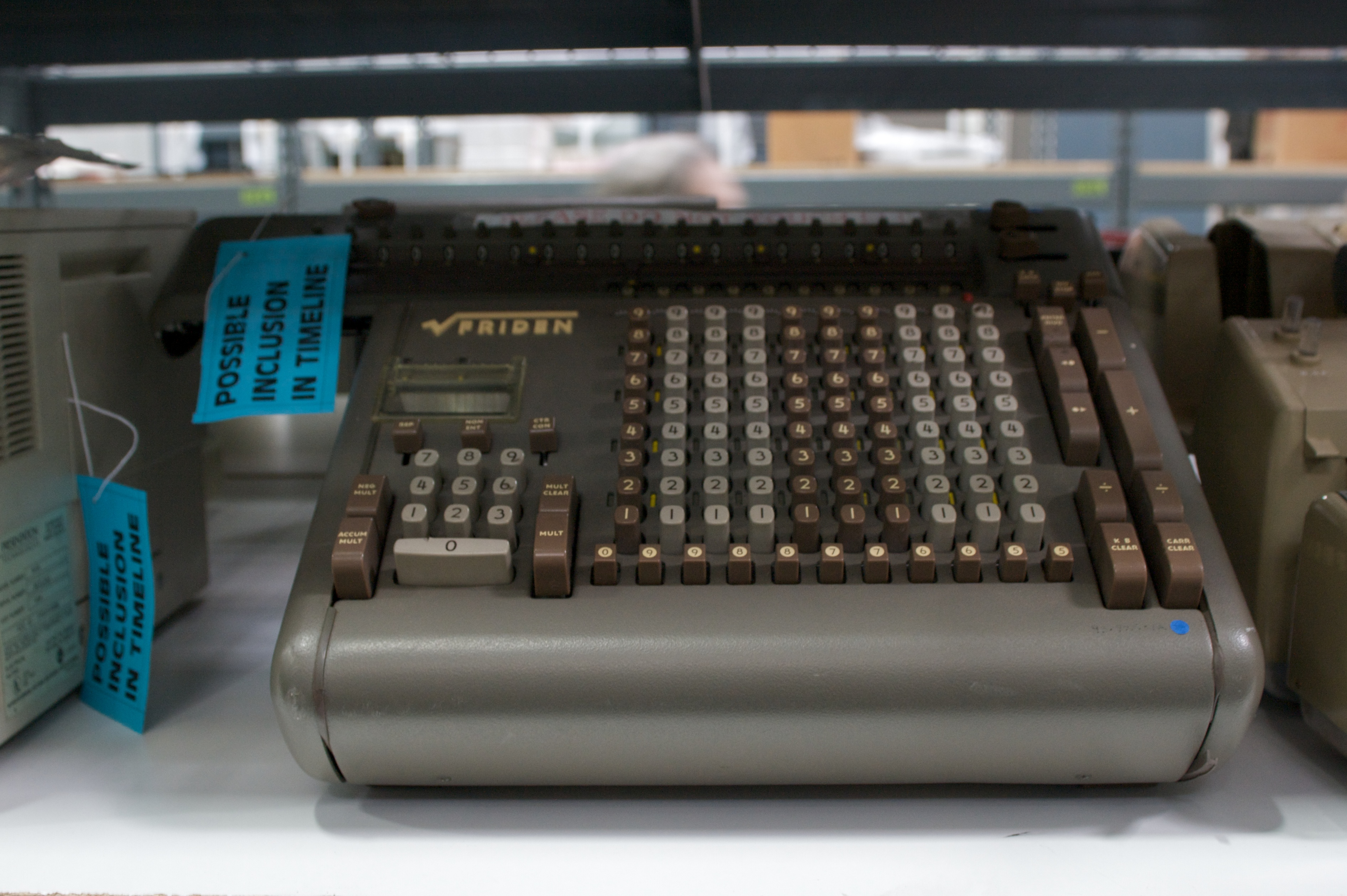
Friden Calculator

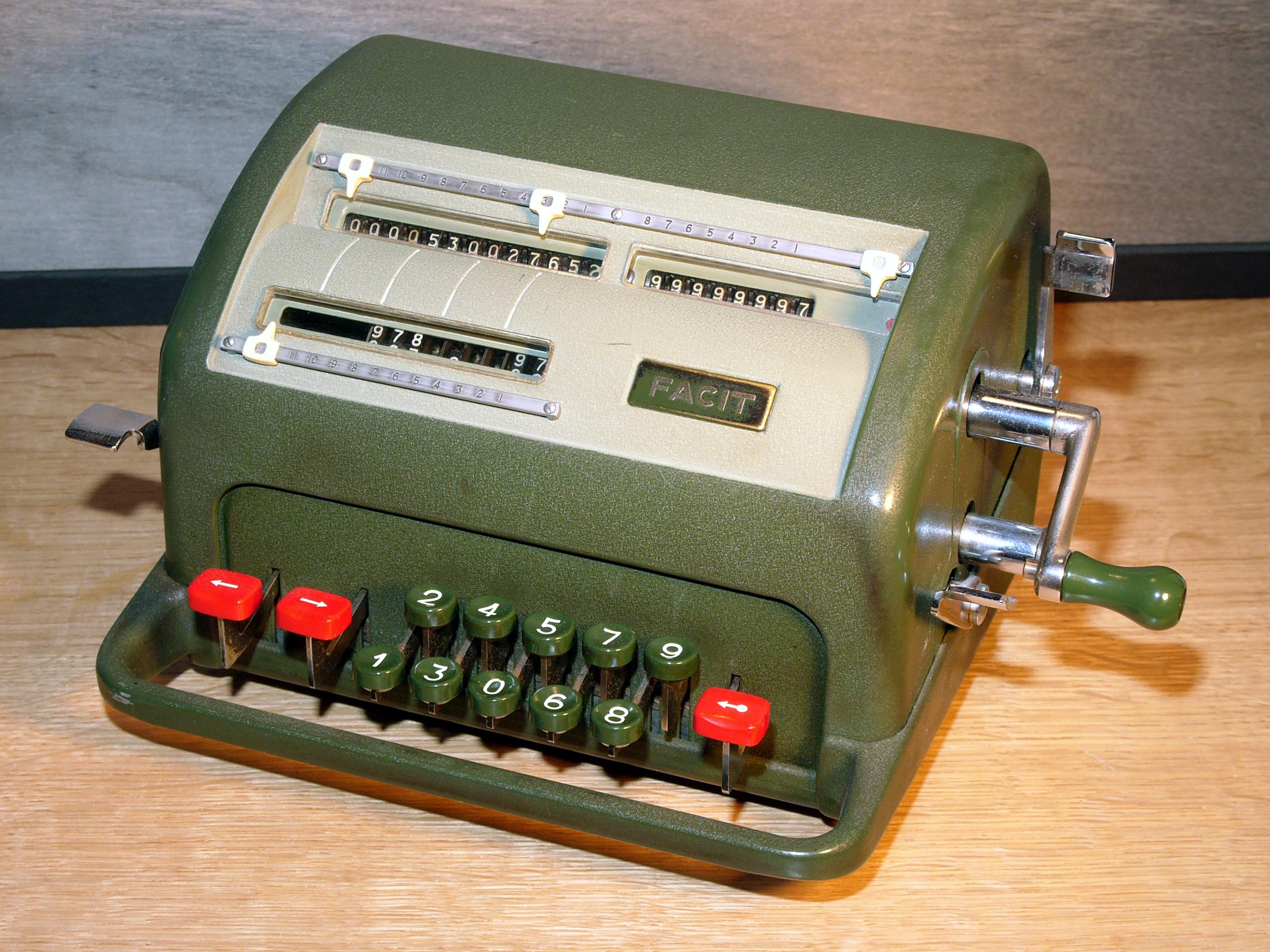
Facit NTK (1954)

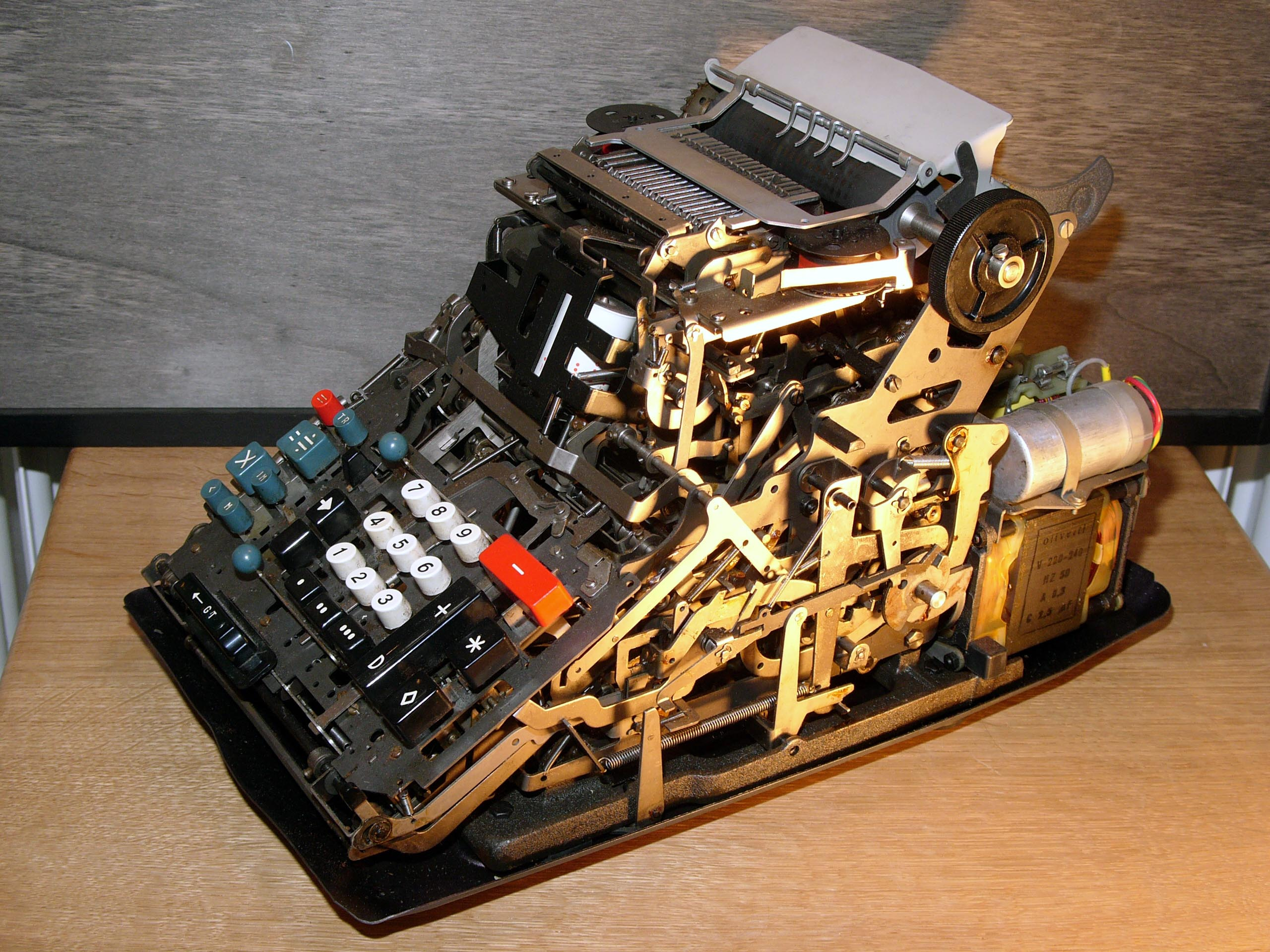
Olivetti Divisumma 24 interior, (1964)

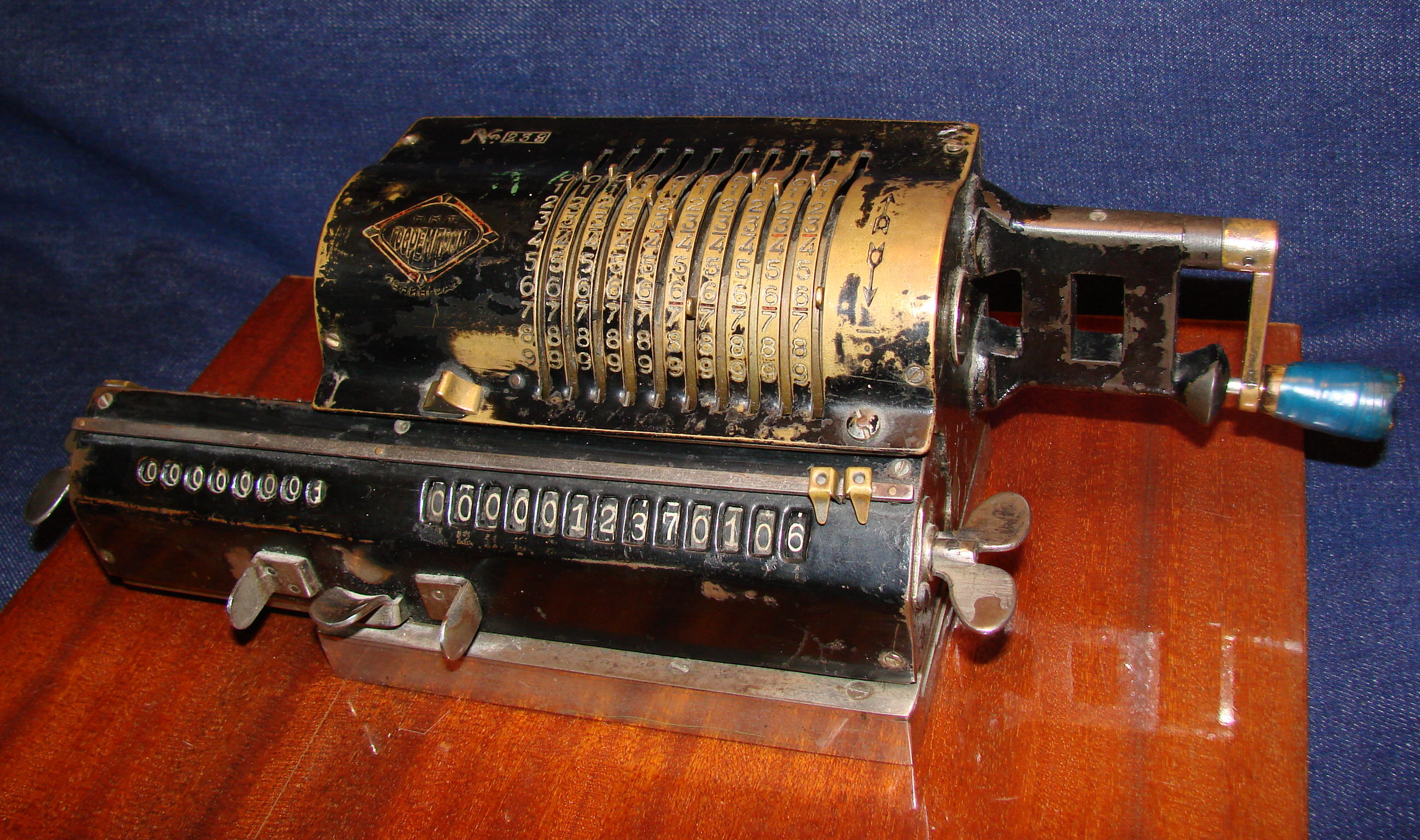
Odhner Arithmometer (1890–1970s)

=== The end of an era ===
Electronic calculators first appeared in 1961, when the world's first all-electronic desktop calculator, the British Bell Punch/Sumlock Comptometer ANITA was announced. Transistorized calculators were first introduced in 1963 and eventually the electronics shrank to a single integrated circuit. These cost-reduction developments put substantial economic pressure on mechanical calculators.

Mechanical calculators continued to be sold, though in rapidly decreasing numbers, into the early 1970s, with many of the manufacturers closing down or being taken over. Comptometer type calculators were often retained for much longer to be used for adding and listing duties, especially in accounting, since a trained and skilled operator could enter all the digits of a number in one movement of the hands on a comptometer quicker than was possible serially with a 10-key electronic calculator. In fact, it was quicker to enter larger digits in two strokes using only the lower-numbered keys; for instance, a 9 would be entered as 4 followed by 5. Some key-driven calculators had keys for every column, but only 1 through 5; they were correspondingly compact. The spread of the computer rather than the simple electronic calculator put an end to the comptometer. Also, by the end of the 1970s, the slide rule had become obsolete.

== See also ==
- Abacus
- Adding machine
- Calculator
- History of computing hardware
- Mechanical computer
- Tabulating machine
- George Brown (inventor)

== Sources ==
- De la machine à calculer de Pascal à l'ordinateur (in French). Paris, France: Musée National des Techniques, CNAM. 1990. ISBN 2-908207-07-9.
- Trogemann, G.; Nitussov, A. (2001). Computing in Russia. Germany: GWV-Vieweg. ISBN 3-528-05757-2.
- Felt, Dorr E. (1916). Mechanical arithmetic, or The history of the counting machine. Chicago: Washington Institute.
- Marguin, Jean (1994). Histoire des instruments et machines à calculer, trois siècles de mécanique pensante 1642–1942 (in French). Hermann. ISBN 978-2-7056-6166-3.
- Mourlevat, Guy (1988). Les machines arithmétiques de Blaise Pascal (in French). Clermont-Ferrand: La Française d'Edition et d'Imprimerie.
- Taton, René (1969). Histoire du calcul. Que sais-je ? n° 198 (in French). Presses universitaires de France.
- Turck, J.A.V. (1921). Origin of Modern Calculating Machines. The Western Society of Engineers. Reprinted by Arno Press, 1972 ISBN 0-405-04730-4.
- Ginsburg, Jekuthiel (2003). Scripta Mathematica (Septembre 1932-Juin 1933). Kessinger Publishing, LLC. ISBN 978-0-7661-3835-3.
- Martin, Ernst (1992) [1925]. The Charles Babbage Institute (ed.). The Calculating Machines (Die Rechenmaschinen). Cambridge, Massachusetts: The MIT Press.
- Cohen, I. Bernard (2000). Howard Aiken : Portrait of a Computer Pioneer. Cambridge, Massachusetts: The MIT Press. ISBN 9-780262-531795.
- Smith, David Eugene (1929). A Source Book in Mathematics. New York and London: McGraw-Hill Book Company, Inc.
- Moseley, Maboth (1964). Irascible Genius, Charles Babbage Inventor. London: Hutchinson & Co, Ltd.
- Bowden, B. V. (1953). Faster than thought. New York, Toronto, London: Pitman publishing corporation.
- Williams, Michael R. (1997). History of Computing Technology. Los Alamitos, California: IEEE Computer Society. ISBN 0-8186-7739-2.
- Randell, Brian (1973). The origins of Digital computers, Selected Papers. Springer-Verlag. ISBN 3-540-06169-X.
- IBM. A calculator Chronicle, 300 years of counting and reckoning tools. New York.
- Collier, Bruce (1990). The little engine that could've: The calculating machines of Charles Babbage. Garland Publishing Inc. ISBN 0-8240-0043-9.
- Essinger, James (2004). Jacquard's Web. Oxford University Press. ISBN 0-19-280577-0.
- Hook, Diana H.; Norman, Jeremy M. (2001). Origins of Cyberspace. Novato, California: historyofscience.com. ISBN 0-930405-85-4.
- M (31 October 1942). "Pascal tercentenary celebration". Nature. 150 (3809). London: 527. Bibcode:1942Natur.150..527M. doi:10.1038/150527a0.
- Prof. S. Chapman (31 October 1942). "Blaise Pascal (1623-1662) Tercentenary of the calculating machine". Nature. 150 (3809). London: 508–509. Bibcode:1942Natur.150..508C. doi:10.1038/150508a0.
- "Usage de la machine". Courrier du Centre International Blaise Pascal (in French) (8). Clermont-Ferrand: 4–25. 1986.
