= George Brown (inventor) =

George Brown (1650–1730) was a Scottish arithmetician, and inventor of two incomplete mechanical calculating machines now kept at the National Museum of Scotland. In 1698 he was granted a patent for his mechanical calculating device.

He was minister of Stranraer, schoolmaster in Fordyce, Banffshire, and in 1680 schoolmaster at Kilmaurs, Ayrshire. He invented a method of teaching the simple rules of arithmetic, which he explained in his Rotula Arithmetica, 1700. He wrote other arithmetical works; the last of them, Arithmetica Infinitorum, was endorsed by John Keill.
