= Curta =

Mechanical pocket calculator

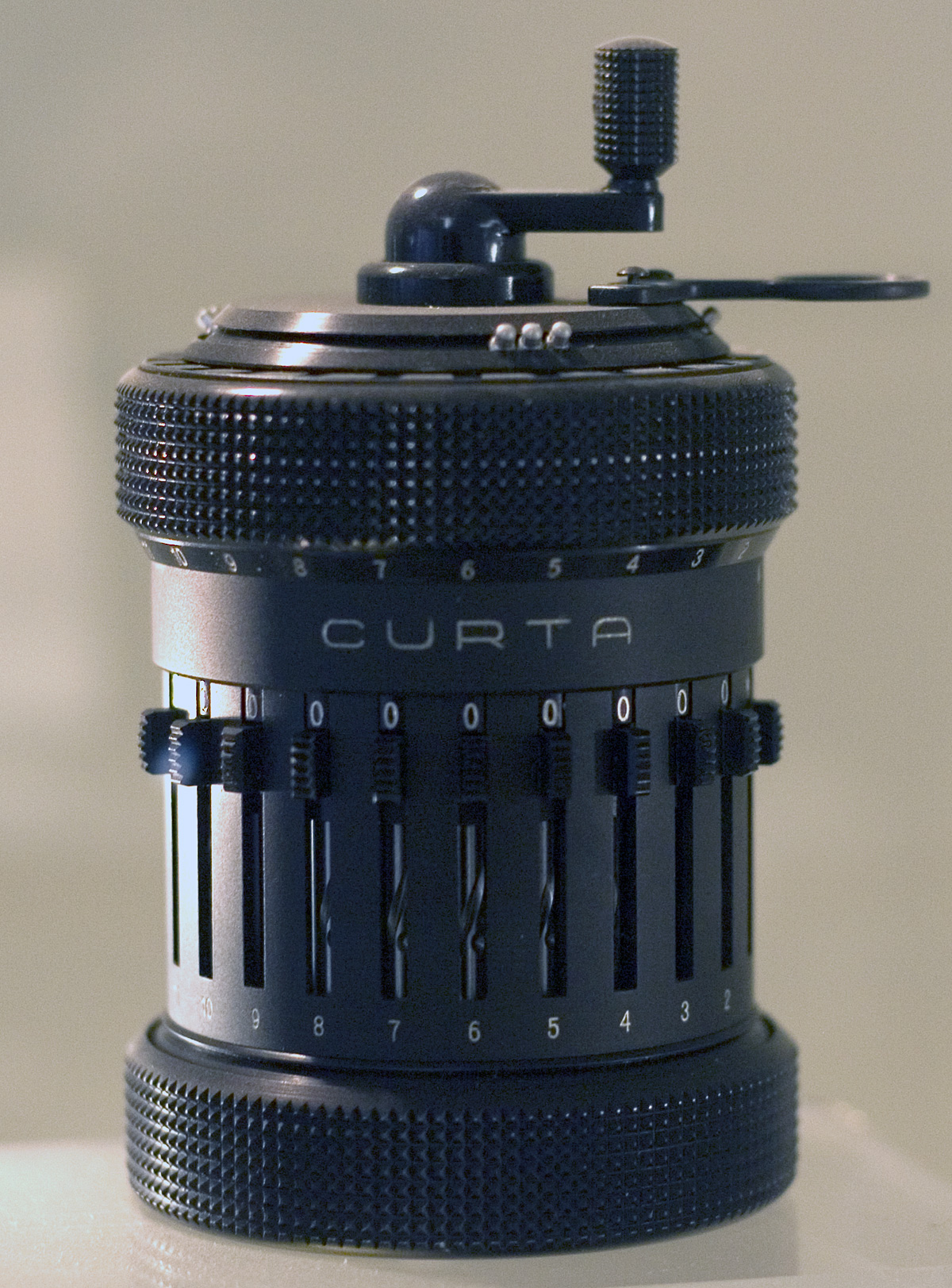
- Curta Type II mechanical calculator
- Type: Mechanical calculator
- Manufacturer: Contina AG Mauren
- Introduced: 1948 (Type I); 1954 (Type II)
- Discontinued: 1972
- Date invented: 1930s
- Invented by: Curt Herzstark
- Cost: $125 (Type I) $165 (Type II)

Calculator
- Precision: 11 digits (Type I); 15 digits (Type II)
- Display type: Mechanical counter
- Display size: 6-digit revolution counter, 11-digit result counter (Type I); 8-digit revolution counter, 15-digit result counter (Type II)

Other
- Weight: 230 g (8.1 oz) (Type I); 360 g (13 oz) (Type II)

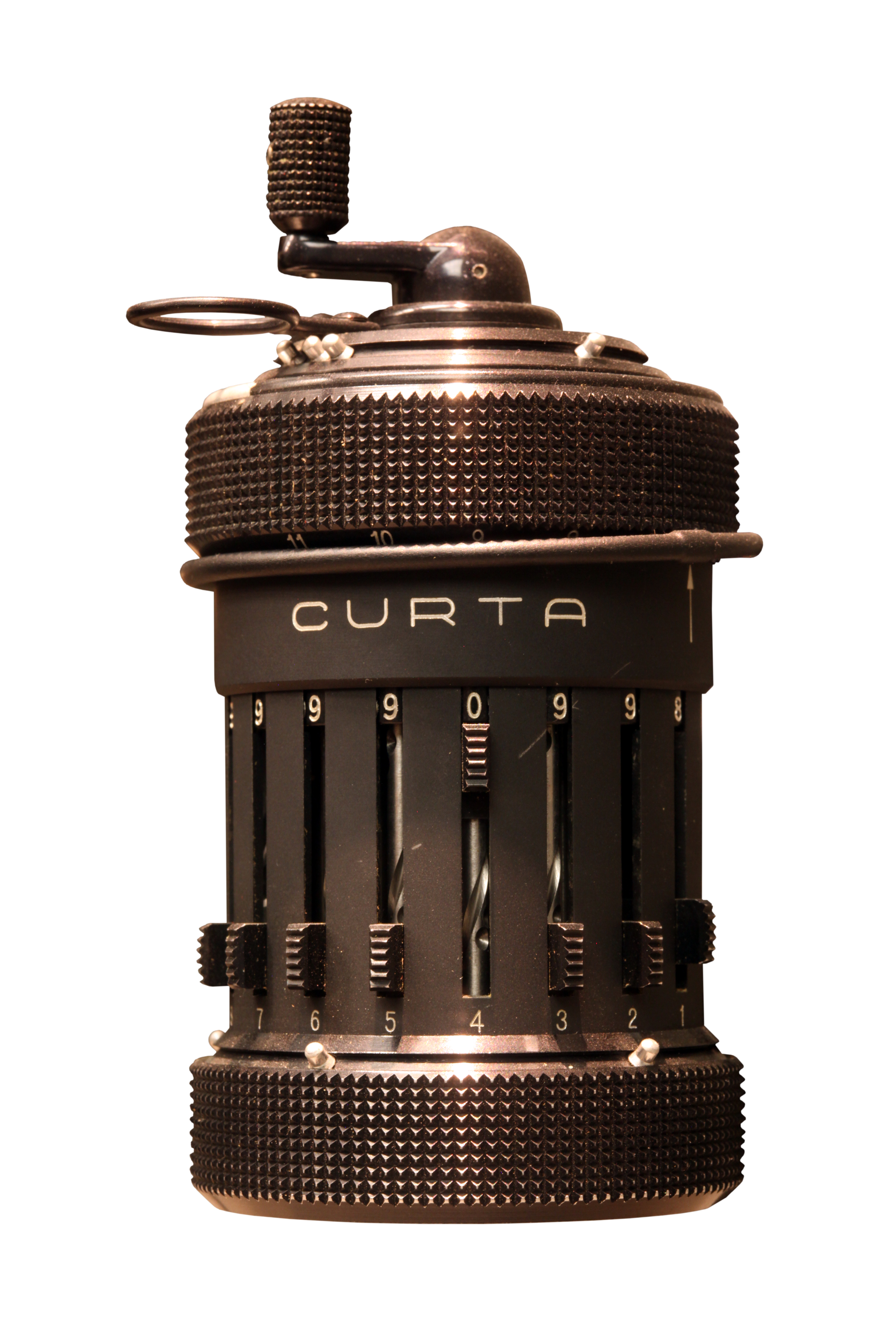
Curta Type I, on display at the Musée des Arts et Métiers, Paris.

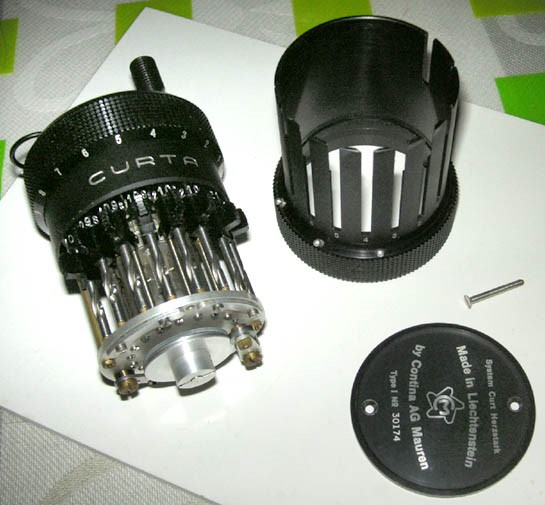
A partially disassembled Curta calculator, showing the digit slides and the stepped drum behind them

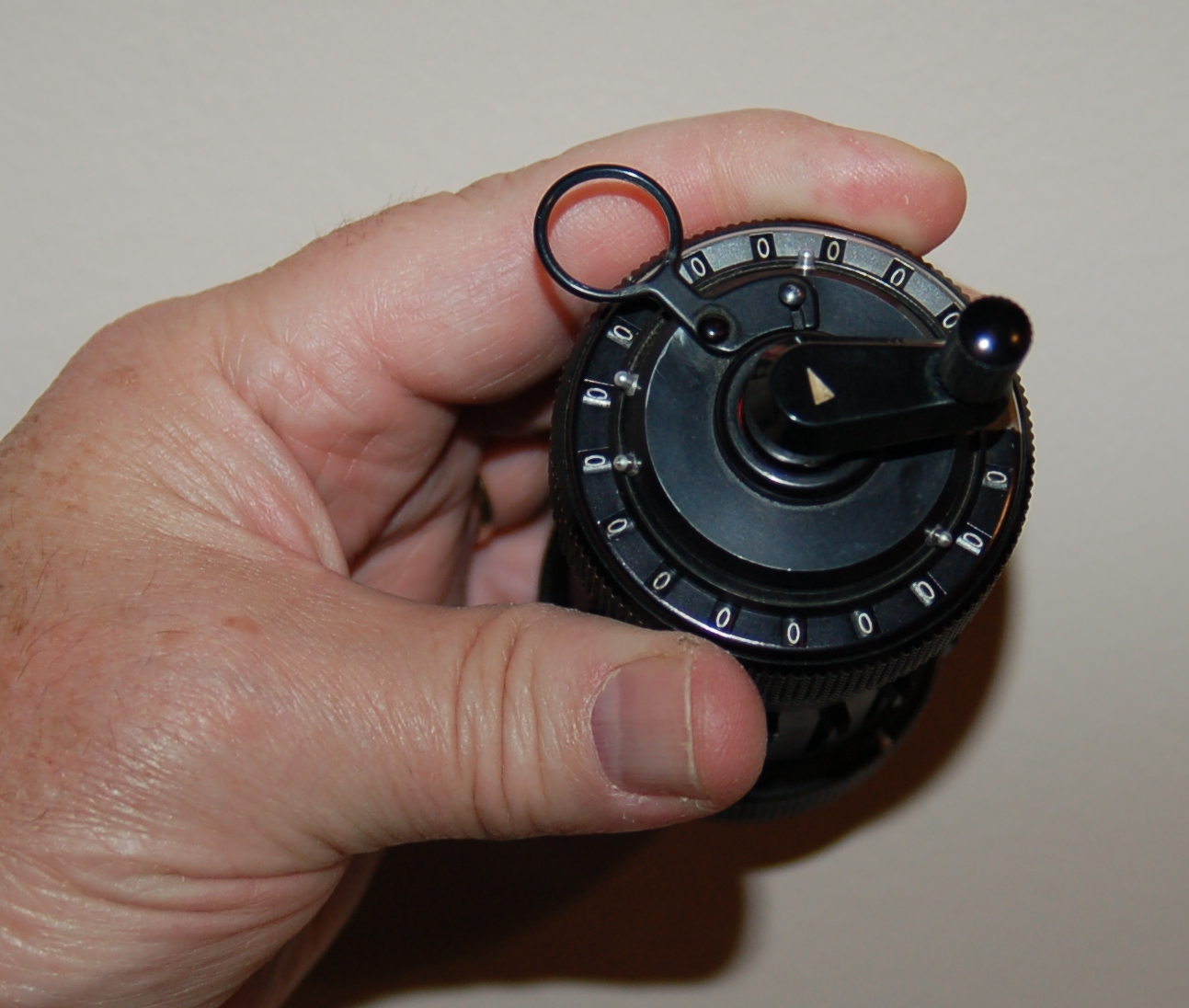
Curta Type I calculator, top view

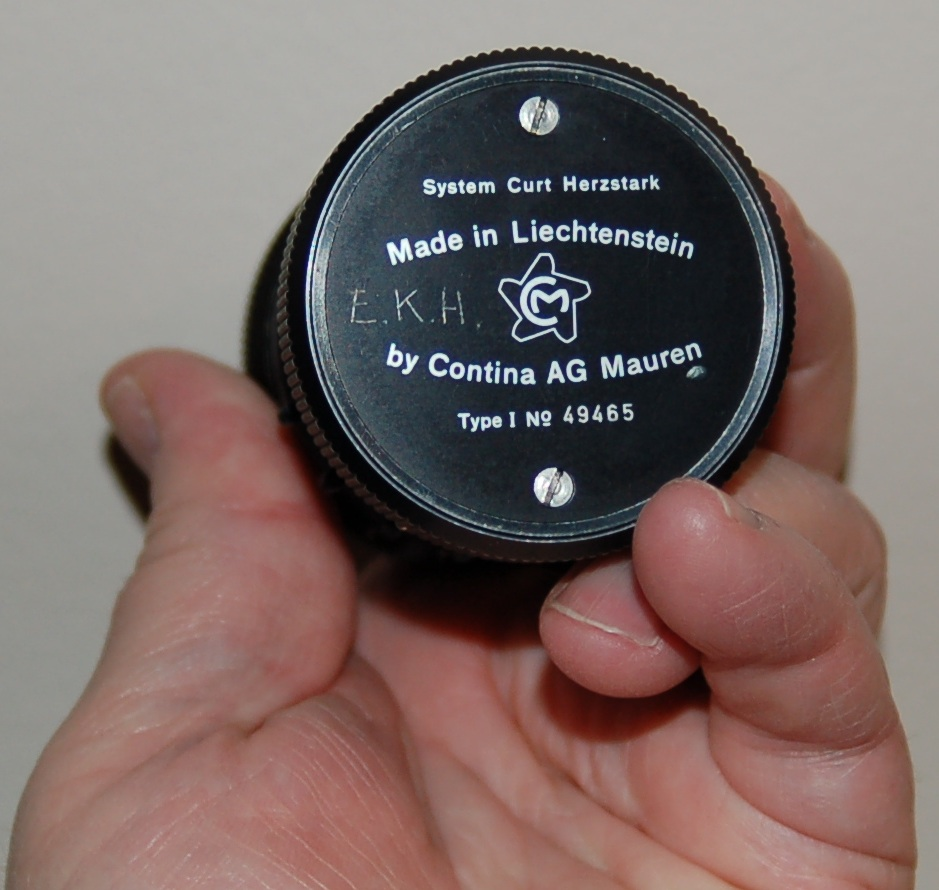
Curta Type I calculator, bottom view

The Curta is a hand-held mechanical calculator designed by Curt Herzstark. It is known for its extremely compact design: a small cylinder that fits in the palm of the hand. It was affectionately known as the "pepper grinder" or "peppermill" due to its shape and means of operation; its superficial resemblance to a certain type of hand grenade also earned it the nickname "math grenade".

Curtas were considered the best portable calculators available until they were displaced by electronic calculators in the 1970s.

== History ==
The Curta was conceived by Curt Herzstark in the 1930s in Vienna, Austria. By 1938, he had filed a key patent, covering his complemented stepped drum. This single drum replaced the multiple drums, typically around 10 or so, of contemporary calculators, and it enabled not only addition, but subtraction through nines complement math, essentially subtracting by adding. The nines' complement math breakthrough eliminated the significant mechanical complexity created when "borrowing" during subtraction. This drum was the key to miniaturizing the Curta.

His work on the pocket calculator stopped in 1938 when the Germans forced him and his company to concentrate on manufacturing precision instruments for the German army.

Herzstark, the son of a Catholic mother and Jewish father, was taken into custody in 1943 and eventually sent to Buchenwald concentration camp, where he was encouraged to continue his earlier research:

While I was imprisoned inside Buchenwald I had, after a few days, told the [people] in the work production scheduling department of my ideas. The head of the department, Mr. Munich said, 'See, Herzstark, I understand you've been working on a new thing, a small calculating machine. Do you know, I can give you a tip. We will allow you to make and draw everything. If it is really worth something, then we will give it to the Führer as a present after we win the war. Then, surely, you will be made an Aryan.' For me, that was the first time I thought to myself, my God, if you do this, you can extend your life. And then and there I started to draw the CURTA, the way I had imagined it.

— Curt Herzstark, Oral history interview with Curt Herzstark (1987), pp. 36-37

In the camp, Herzstark was able to develop working drawings for a manufacturable device. Buchenwald was liberated by U.S. troops on 11 April 1945, and by November Herzstark had located a factory in Sommertal, near Weimar, whose machinists were skilled enough to produce three working prototypes.

Soviet forces had arrived in July, and Herzstark feared being sent to Russia, so, later that same month, he fled to Austria. He began to look for financial backers, at the same time filing continuing patents as well as several additional patents to protect his work. Franz Joseph II, Prince of Liechtenstein eventually showed interest in the manufacture of the device, and soon a newly formed company, Contina AG Mauren, began production in Liechtenstein.

It was not long before Herzstark's financial backers, thinking they had got from him all they needed, conspired to force him out by reducing the value of all of the company's existing stock to zero, including his one-third interest. These were the same people who had earlier elected not to have Herzstark transfer ownership of his patents to the company, so that, should anyone sue, they would be suing Herzstark, not the company, thereby protecting themselves at Herzstark's expense. This ploy now backfired: without the patent rights, they could manufacture nothing. Herzstark was able to negotiate a new agreement, and money continued to flow to him.

Curtas were considered the best portable calculators available until they were displaced by electronic calculators in the 1970s. The Curta, however, lives on, being a highly popular collectible, with thousands of machines working just as smoothly as they did at the time of their manufacture.

An estimated 140,000 Curta calculators were made (80,000 Type I and 60,000 Type II). According to Curt Herzstark, the last Curta was produced in 1972.

== Cost ==
In the United States, the Curta Type I was sold for US$125 in the later years of production, and the Type II was sold for $175. While only 3% of Curtas were returned to the factory for warranty repair, a small, but significant number of buyers returned their Curtas in pieces, having attempted to disassemble them. Reassembling the machine was more difficult, requiring intimate knowledge of the orientation of, and installation order for, each part and sub-assembly, plus special guides designed to hold the pieces in place during assembly. Many identical-looking parts, each with slightly different dimensions, required test fitting and selection as well as special tools to adjust to design tolerances.

The Curta retains a high monetary value, with an average price of around US$1,000 to 2,000 depending on condition and functionality.

== Design ==
The Curta's design is a descendant of Gottfried Leibniz's Stepped Reckoner and Charles Thomas's Arithmometer, accumulating values on cogs, which are added or complemented by a stepped drum mechanism.

Numbers are entered using slides (one slide per digit) on the side of the device. The revolution counter and result counter reside around the shiftable carriage, at the top of the machine. A single turn of the crank adds the input number to the result counter, at any carriage position, and increments the corresponding digit of the revolution counter. Pulling the crank upwards slightly before turning performs a subtraction instead of an addition. Multiplication, division, and other functions require a series of crank and carriage-shifting operations.

== Models ==
The Type I Curta has eight digits for data entry (known as "setting sliders"), a six-digit revolution counter, and an eleven-digit result counter. According to the advertising literature, it weighs only 228 grams (8.0 oz). Serial number 70154, produced in 1969, weighs 245 grams (8.6 oz).

The larger Type II Curta, introduced in 1954, has eleven digits for data entry, an eight-digit revolution counter, and a fifteen-digit result counter.

== Uses ==
The Curta was popular among contestants in sports car rallies during the 1960s, 1970s and into the 1980s. Even after the introduction of the electronic calculator for other purposes, they were used in time-speed-distance (TSD) rallies to aid in computation of times to checkpoints, distances off-course and so on, since the early electronic calculators did not fare well with the bounces and jolts of rallying.

The Curta was also favored by commercial and general-aviation pilots before the advent of electronic calculators because of its precision and the user's ability to confirm the accuracy of their manipulations via the revolution counter. Because calculations such as weight and balance are critical for safe flight, precise results free of pilot error are essential.

== Collections ==
The Curta calculator is very popular among collectors and can be purchased on many platforms. The Swiss entrepreneur and collector Peter Regenass holds a large collection of mechanical calculators, among them over 100 Curta calculators. A part of his collections is on display at the Enter Museum in Solothurn, Switzerland. In 2016 he donated a Curta calculator to the Yad Vashem Museum in Jerusalem.

== Popular culture ==
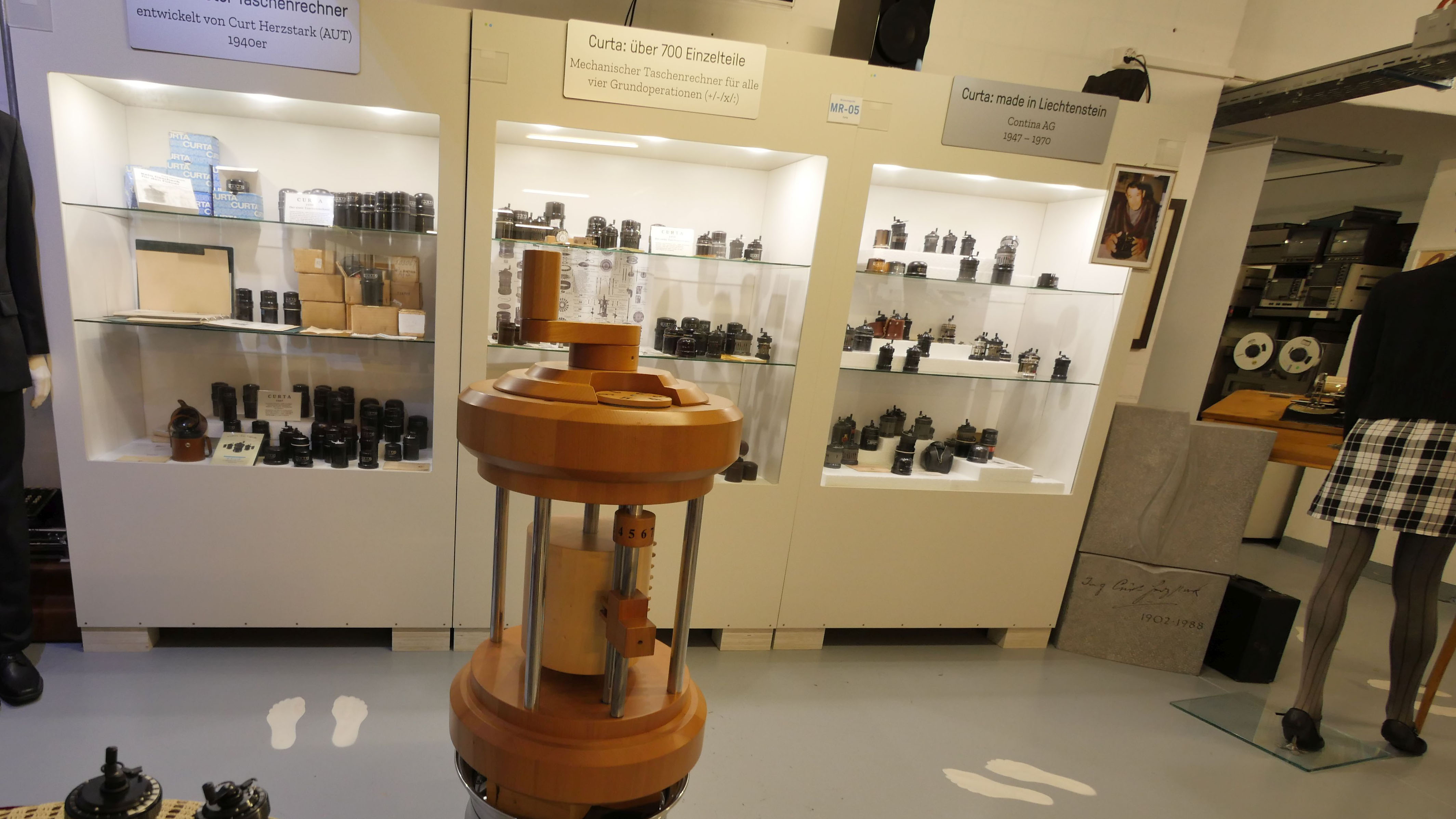
The Curta collection of the Swiss entrepreneur Peter Regenass on display at the Enter Museum Solothurn

The Curta plays a role in William Gibson's Pattern Recognition (2003) as a piece of historic computing machinery as well as a crucial "trade" item.

In 2016 a Curta was designed by Marcus Wu that could be produced on a 3D printer. The Curta's fine tolerances were beyond the ability of printer technology of 2017 to produce to scale, so the printed Curta was about the size of a coffee can and weighed about three pounds.
