= Curt Herzstark =

Austrian engineer (1902–1988)

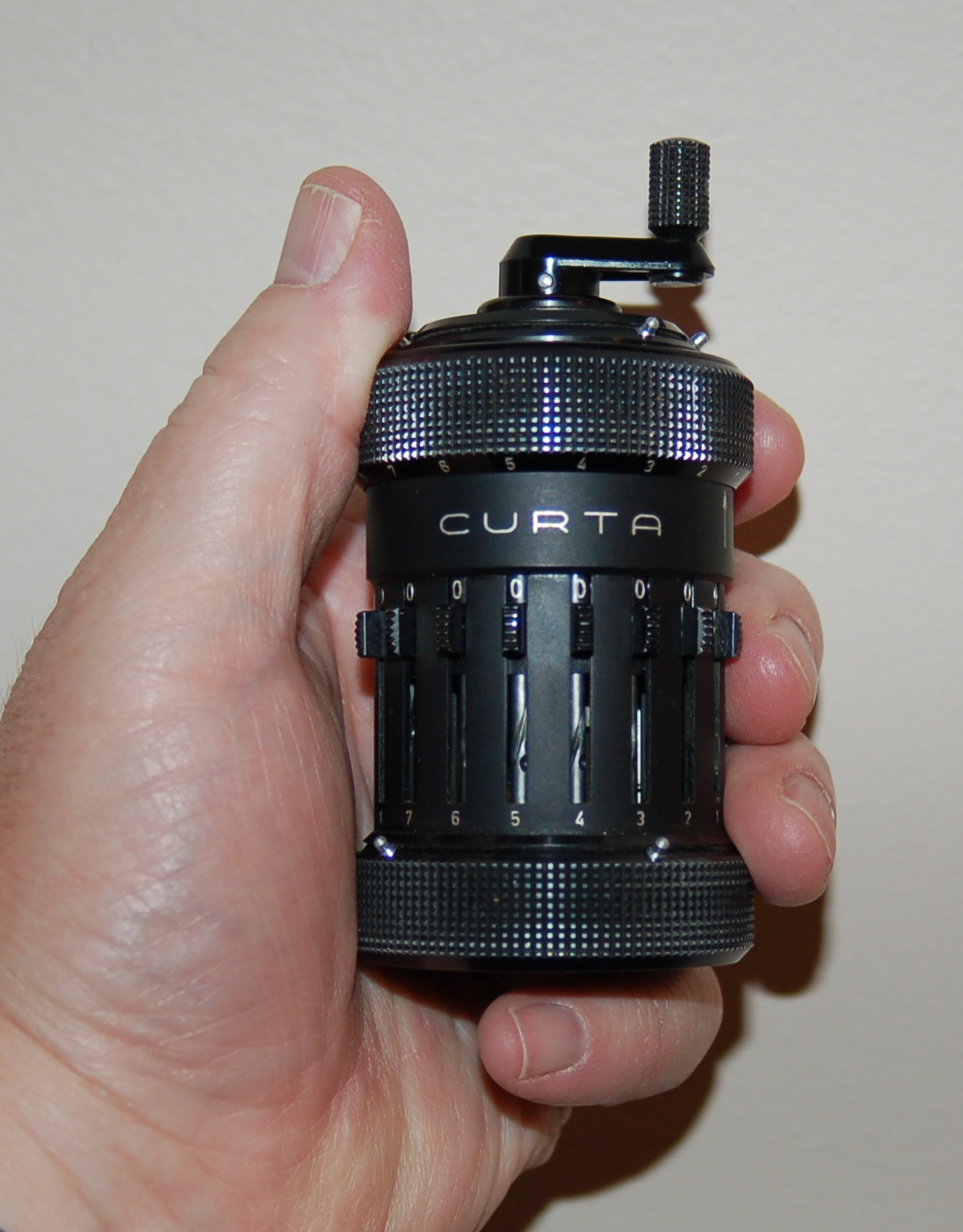
Curta (Type I) mechanical calculator shown in the operational position (left hand). The crank is turned with the right hand.

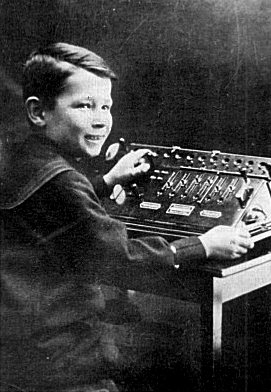
Curt Herzstark at the 1910 office equipment exhibition in Vienna

Curt Herzstark (26 January 1902 – 27 October 1988) was an Austrian engineer. During World War II, he designed plans for the mechanical pocket calculator known as the Curta.

== Life and career ==
Herzstark was born in Vienna, the son of Marie and Samuel Jakob Herzstark. His father was Jewish and his mother, born a Catholic, converted to Lutheranism and raised Herzstark as a Lutheran.

In 1938, while he was technical manager of his father's company Rechenmaschinenwerk Austria Herzstark & Co., Herzstark had already completed the design of the Curta, but could not manufacture it due to the Nazi German annexation of Austria. Instead, the company was ordered to make measuring devices for the German Army. In 1943, perhaps influenced by the fact that his father was a liberal Jew, the Nazis arrested him for "helping Jews and subversive elements" and "indecent contacts with Aryan women" and sent him to the Buchenwald concentration camp. However, the reports of the army about the precision-production of the firm and especially about the technical expertise of Herzstark led the Nazis to treat him as an "intelligence-slave".

His imprisonment at Buchenwald seriously threatened his health, but his condition improved when he was called to work in the factory linked to the camp, which was named after Wilhelm Gustloff. There, he was ordered to make a drawing of the construction of his calculator, so that the Nazis could ultimately give the machine to the Führer as a gift after the successful end of the war. The preferential treatment this allowed ensured that he survived his stay at Buchenwald until the camp's liberation in 1945, by which time he had redrawn the complete construction from memory.

Herzstark died in Nendeln, Liechtenstein.

== In popular culture ==
The Curta is referenced in chapter four of William Gibson's Pattern Recognition. The chapter is entitled 'Math Grenades', which refers to protagonist Cayce Pollard mistaking a box of them for hand grenades at first glance.
