= Pinwheel calculator =

Type of mechanical calculator

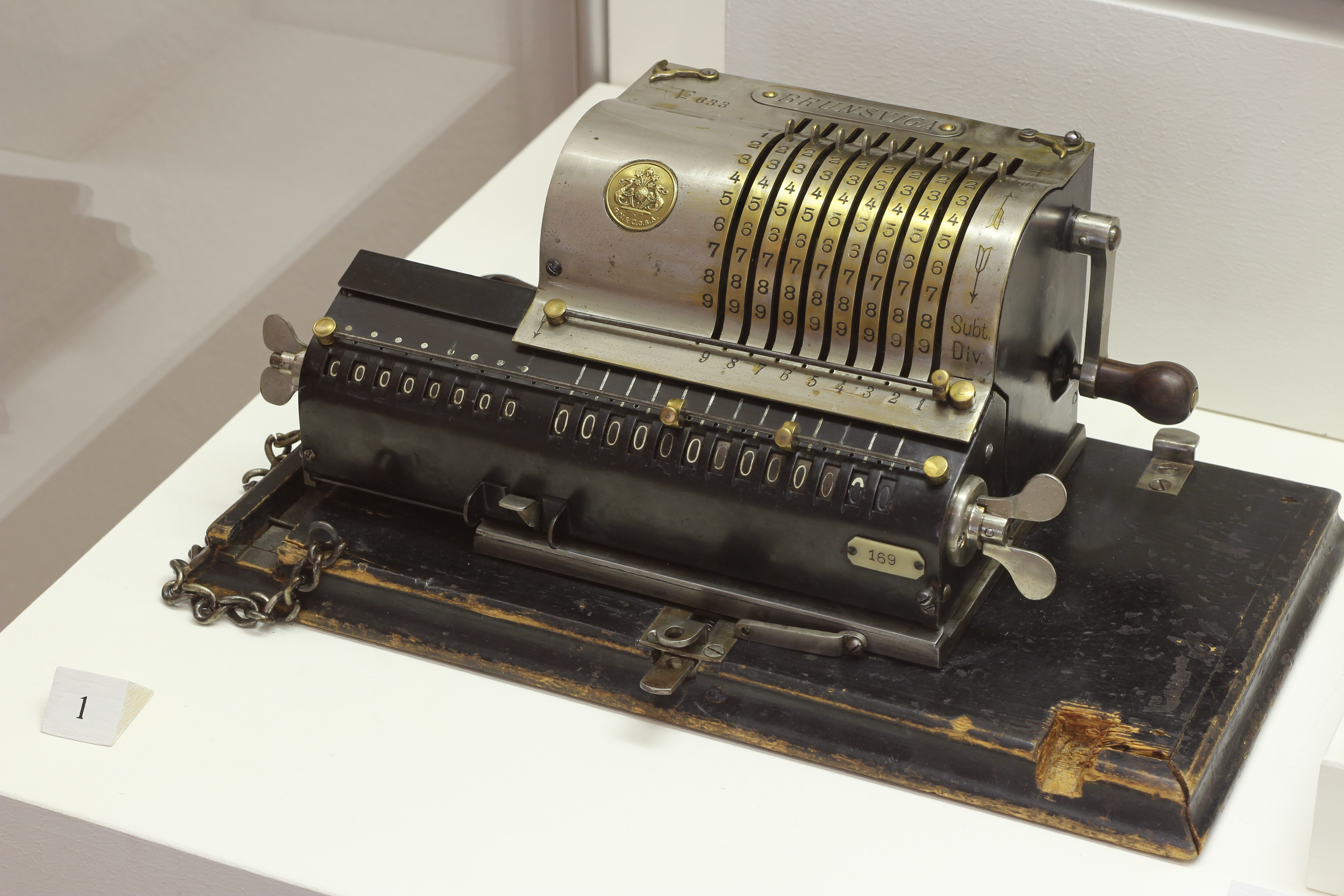
Brunsviga pinwheel calculator

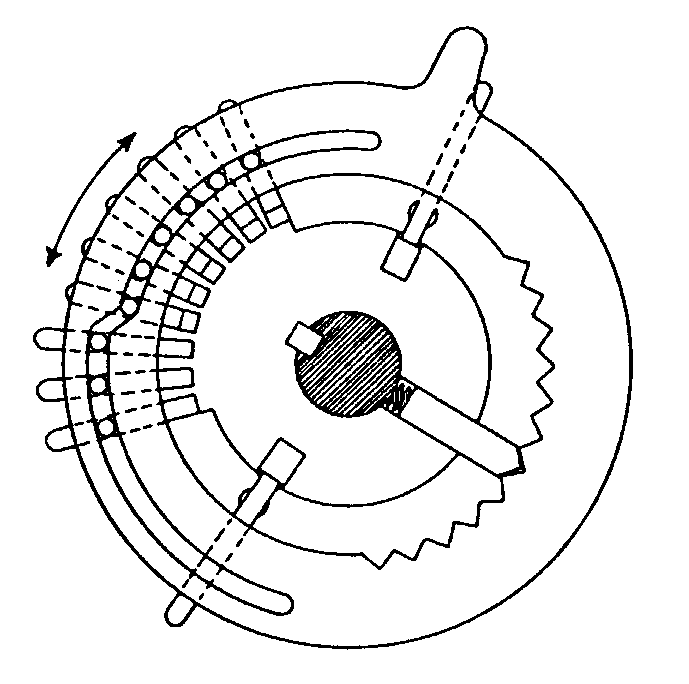
One variant for extending and retracting the teeth of a "pinwheel" with a secondary wheel on its side.

A pinwheel calculator is a class of mechanical calculator described as early as 1685, and popular in the 19th and 20th century, calculating via wheels whose number of teeth were adjustable. These wheels, also called pinwheels, could be set by using a side lever which could expose anywhere from 0 to 9 teeth, and therefore when coupled to a counter they could, at each rotation, add a number from 0 to 9 to the result. By linking these wheels with carry mechanisms a new kind of calculator engine was invented. Turn the wheels one way and one performs an addition, the other way a subtraction.

As part of a redesign of the arithmometer, they reduced by an order of magnitude the cost and the size of mechanical calculators on which one could easily do the four basic operations (add, subtract, multiply and divide).

Pinwheel calculators became extremely popular with the success of Thomas' Arithmometer (manufactured 1850s) and Odhner Arithmometer (manufactured 1890s).

== History ==
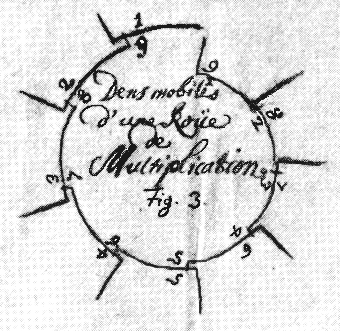
Drawing from Leibniz: "Adjustable teeth of a multiplication wheel"

In "Machina arithmetica in qua non additio tantum et subtractio sed et multiplicatio nullo, diviso vero paene nullo animi labore peragantur", written in 1685, Leibniz described an arithmetic machine he had invented that was made by linking two separate machines, one to perform additions/subtractions and one for multiplications/divisions. Pascal's calculator was to be used for additions and subtractions (he called it the calculating box of Pascal) and a machine using wheels with movable teeth was to be used for multiplications and divisions. There is no evidence that Leibniz constructed this pinwheel machine, but his Leibniz wheel, which, when coupled to a sliding counting wheel, can mesh with a variable number of teeth, seems to have been his way of implementing a variable number of teeth design.

Giovanni Poleni by 1709 had built a wooden calculating clock calculator that used a pinwheel design; he destroyed it after hearing that Antonius Braun had received 10,000 Guldens for dedicating a pinwheel machine of his own design to the emperor Charles VI of Vienna. Poleni described his machine in his Miscellanea in 1709, but it was also described by Jacob Leupold in his Theatrum Machinarum Generale, ("The General Theory of Machines") which was published in 1727.

Antonius Braun was a native of Swabia; his machine, which he presented to the emperor in 1727, was cylindrical in shape and was made of steel, silver and brass; it was finely decorated and looked like a renaissance table clock. It could perform all four operations. His dedication to the emperor engraved on the top of the machine also reads "..to make easy to ignorant people, addition, subtraction, multiplication and even division".

Lord Stanhope of the United Kingdom designed a pinwheel machine in 1775. It was set in a rectangular box with a handle on the side. He also designed a machine using Leibniz wheels in 1777.

Dr. Didier Roth, a French inventor, patented and built a machine based on that design in 1842.

Izrael Staffel, a polish clockmaker introduced his pinwheel machine in 1845 at an industrial exposition in Warsaw, Poland and won a gold medal in 1851 at The Great Exhibition in London.

Frank S. Baldwin invented a pinwheel calculator in the United States in 1872.

In St. Petersburg, Russia, Wilgott Theophil Odhner invented his arithmometer in 1874 and in 1890 it became the first pinwheel calculator to be mass-manufactured. Its industrial production started in Odhner's workshop: W.T. Odhner, Maschinenfabrik & Metallgiesserei and then moved to the Odhner-Gill factory (фабрика Однера-Гиля) in 1891. Odhner type calculators were more popular in Europe (particularly in Germany) than in the United States.

Grimme, Natalis & Co. bought the rights to Odhner's patents in 1892 and soon after started production in Brunswick, Germany. They sold their machines under the Brunsviga brand name (Brunsviga is the Latin name of the town of Brunswick, just as Braunschweig is its name in German); they became very successful on their own and were the first of a long line of Odhner clone makers.

In 1924, Felix Dzerzhinsky, the head of the Russian Cheka, initiated the manufacturing of arithmometers. Later they were named arithmometer Feliks and served in the Soviet Union well into the 1970s, popularly known under the name "Iron Feliks".

== Operation ==
"The operation of machines of this type was accomplished by means of pulling levers or knobs to set up the desired number. Addition, subtraction, multiplication, and division were accomplished by means of revolving drums. For addition they revolved in one direction, and for subtraction the direction was reversed. For multiplication the revolutions were repeated in the same direction as for addition, and for division they were repeated in the same direction as for subtraction. Two sets of dials provided a means of reading totals. In one the accumulation of totals appeared; in the other, there appeared the figure which was added, subtracted, multiplied, or divided." (The Office Appliance Manual, p. 88)

== Sources ==
- Wolf, Abraham (1959). A History of Science Technology & Philosophy in the 16th & 17th centuries, Volume II. Harper. p. 562.
- Smith, David Eugene (1929). A Source Book in Mathematics. McGraw-Hill.
- Trogemann, Georg; Nitussov, Alexander Y.; Ernst, Wolfgang, eds. (2001). Computing in Russia: The History of Computer Devices and Information Technology Revealed. GWV-Vieweg. ISBN 3-528-05757-2.
- Felt, Dorr E. (1916). Mechanical arithmetic, or The history of the counting machine. Chicago: Washington Institute.
- Marguin, Jean (1994). Histoire des instruments et machines à calculer, trois siècles de mécanique pensante 1642–1942 (in French). Hermann. ISBN 978-2-7056-6166-3.
- Shaw, David J. (1998). The Cathedral Libraries Catalogue. The British Library and the Bibliographical Society.
