= Odhner Arithmometer =

Russian model of mechanical calculator

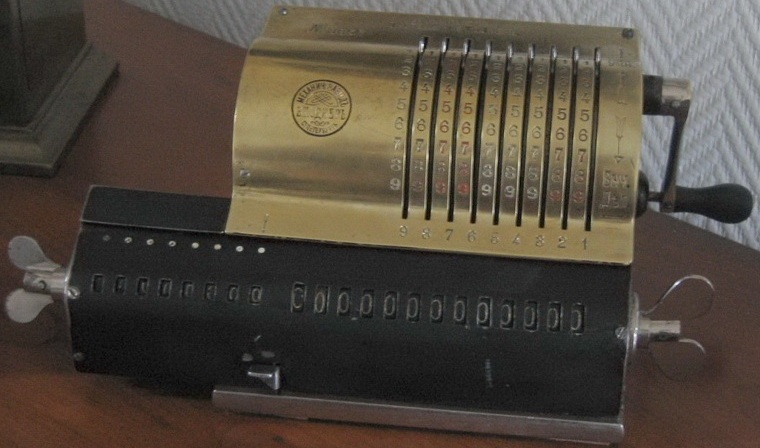
An Odhner machine made under the management of W.T. Odhner in Saint Petersburg before 1900

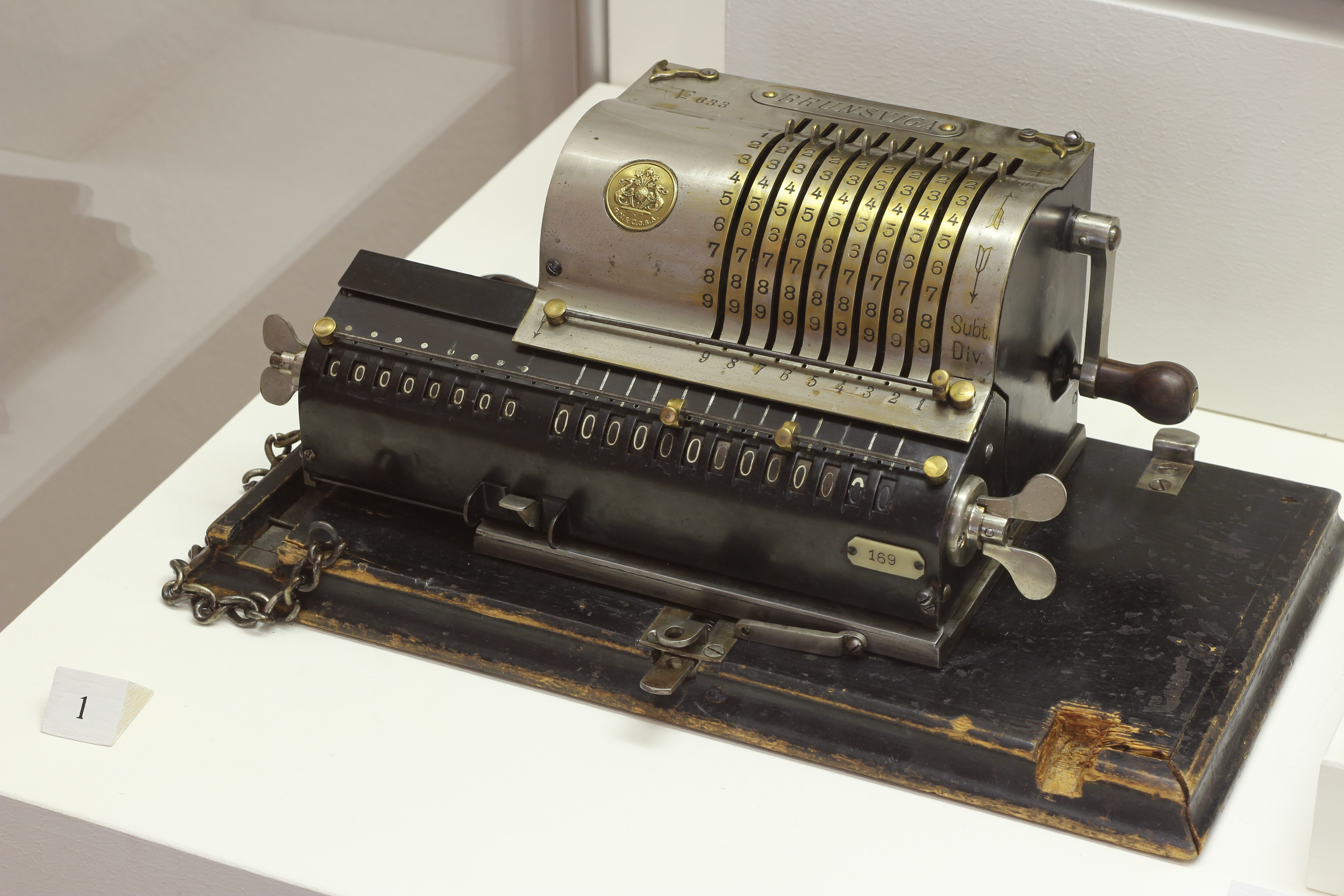
Brunsviga

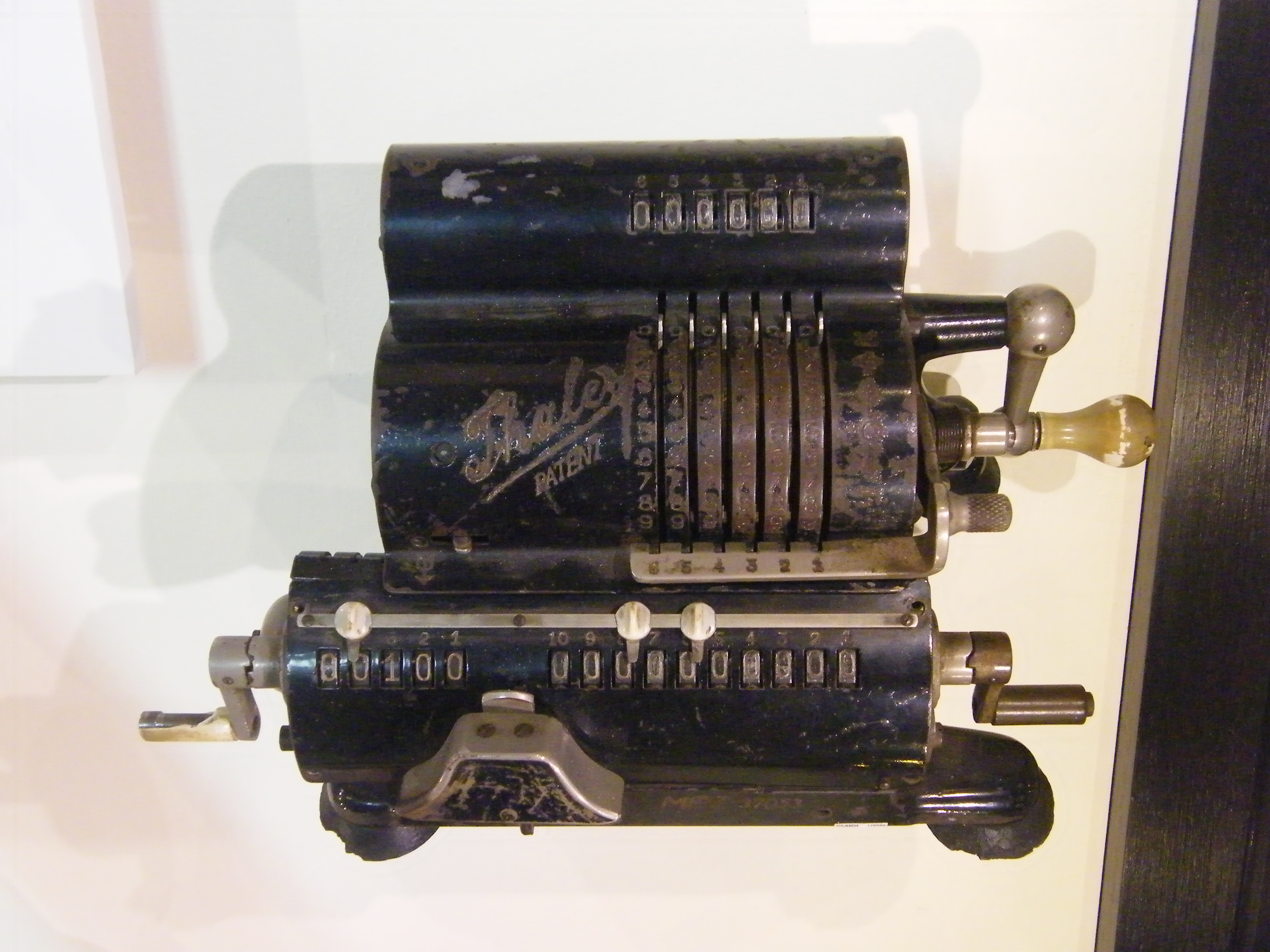
Thales

The Odhner Arithmometer was a very successful pinwheel calculator invented in Russia in 1873 by W. T. Odhner, a Swedish immigrant. Its industrial production officially started in 1890 in Odhner's Saint Petersburg workshop. Even though the machine was very popular, the production only lasted thirty years until the factory was nationalised and closed down during the Russian revolution of 1917.

From 1892 to the middle of the 20th century, independent companies were set up all over the world to manufacture Odhner's clones and, by the 1960s, with millions sold, it became one of the most successful type of mechanical calculator ever designed.

== History ==
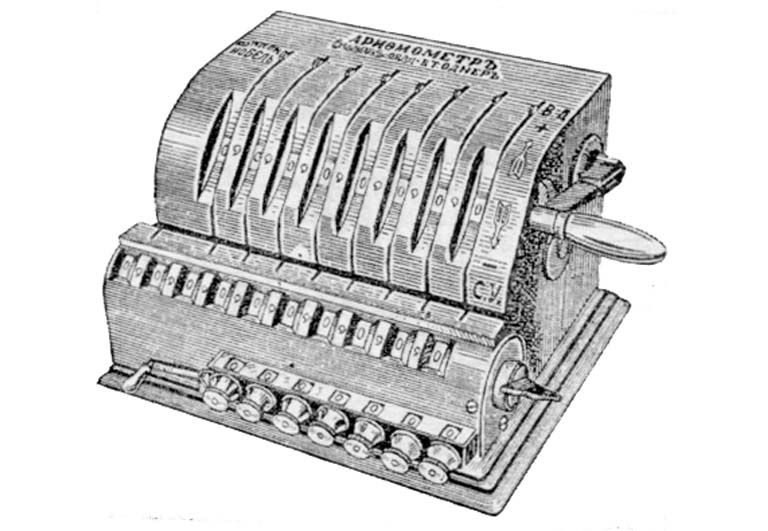
Original design

Odhner thought of his machine in 1871 while repairing a Thomas' Arithmometer (which was the only mechanical calculator in production at the time) and decided to replace its heavy, bulky Leibniz cylinder by a lighter, smaller pinwheel disk. This is why the two machines share the same name but look completely different.

Odhner developed the first version of his mechanical calculator in 1873. In 1876, he agreed to build 14 machines for Ludvig Nobel, his employer at the time, which he delivered in 1877. He patented his original machine in several countries in 1878–1879 and an improved version of it in 1890. The serial production began with this improved machine in 1890.

In 1891, Odhner opened a branch of his factory in Germany. Unfortunately, he had to sell it in 1892 to Grimme, Natalis & Co. because of the difficulty of having two manufacturing facilities so far apart. Grimme, Natalis & Co. started production in Braunschweig and sold their machines under the Brunsviga brand name (Brunsviga is the Latin name of the town of Braunschweig); they became very successful on their own.

After Odhner's death, in 1905, his sons Alexander and Georg and son-in-law Karl Siewert continued the production and about 23,000 calculators were made until the factory was nationalized during the Russian revolution and was forced to close down in 1918. This makes the Brunsviga arithmometer, with its 1892 start, the longest-lasting Odhner type calculator in production.

Desktop Mechanical Calculators in production during the 19th century

== Legacy ==
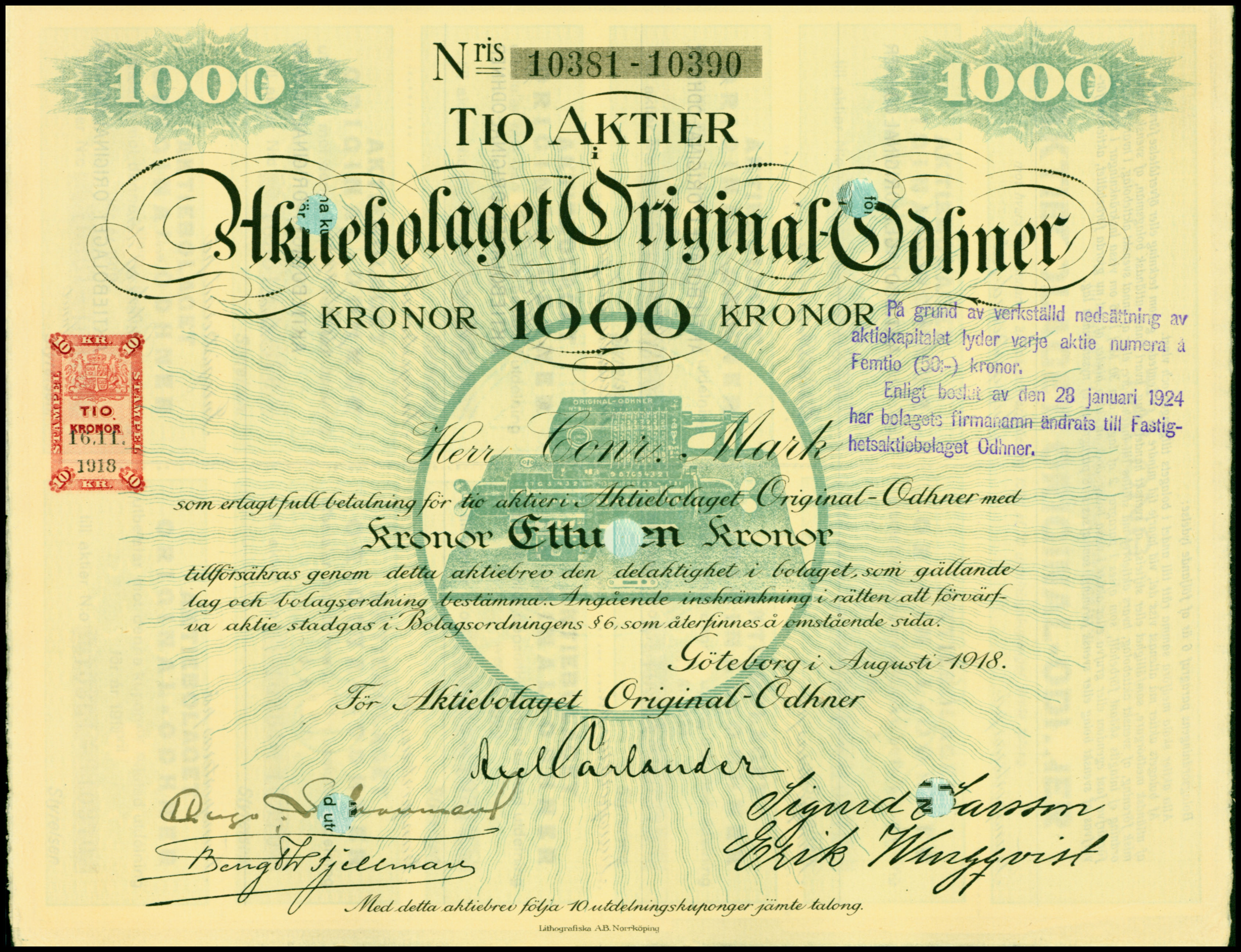
Share of the AB Original-Odhner, issued in August 1918

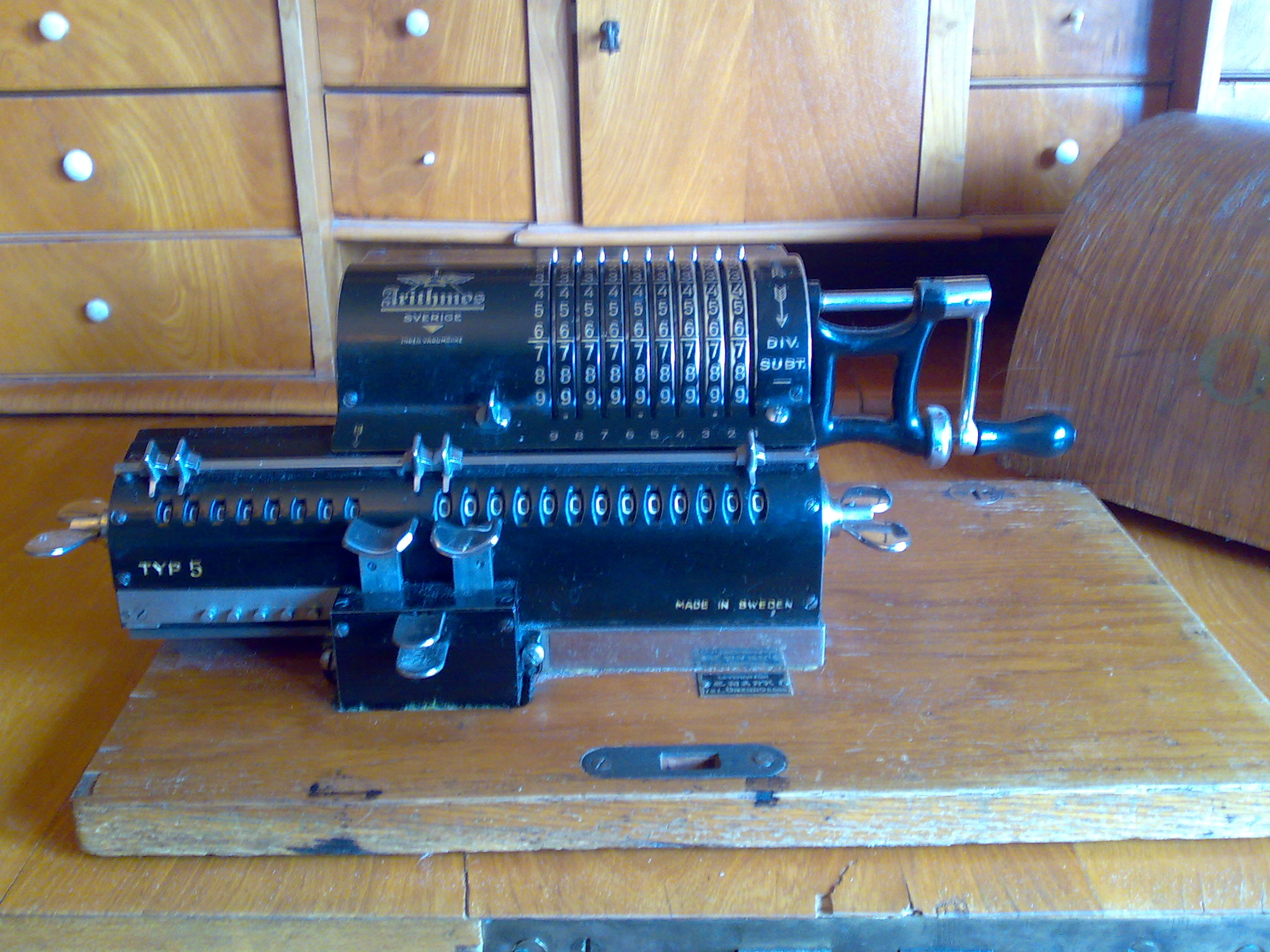
Original-Odhner Arithmos, Type 5, Made in Sweden

Towards the end of 1917, the Odhner family went back to Sweden and restarted the manufacturing of their calculator under the Original-Odhner name. In 1924, the Russian government moved the old production facility to Moscow and commercialized their calculator under the Felix Arithmometer name which went on well into the 1970s.

In 1950, with millions of clones manufactured, the Odhner arithmometer was one of the most popular type of mechanical calculator ever made. The number of machines produced increased constantly until the appearance of the electronic calculators in the early 1970s. For instance, the production of one of them, the Felix arithmometer of Russia, peaked in 1969 with 300,000 machines made.

Odhner's arithmometer was copied, manufactured and sold by many other companies all over the world. In Germany there was Thales, Triumphator, Walther and Brunsviga. In England there was Britannic and Muldivo. In Sweden Multo and Original-Odhner. In Russia Felix and in Japan Tiger and Busicom which, incidentally, was made famous because Intel created the first microprocessor, the Intel 4004, while designing one of their electronic calculators in 1970.
