= René Grillet de Roven =

French clockmaker and inventor

- Born: (fl. 1673–1681); Rouen (Normandy, France)
- Occupations: Clockmaker; inventor; instrument maker
- Known for: Early mechanical calculating machine; scientific instruments (hygrometers, barometers, drawing instruments)
- Notable work: Curiositez mathematiques de l'invention du Sr Grillet horlogeur a Paris (1673)

René Grillet de Roven, also René Grillet, was a French mechanic and watchmaker who designed a mechanical calculating machine in the 17th century.

== Biography ==
Grillet came from Rouen in northwestern France, the capital city of Normandy. He served as watchmaker to King Louis XIV.

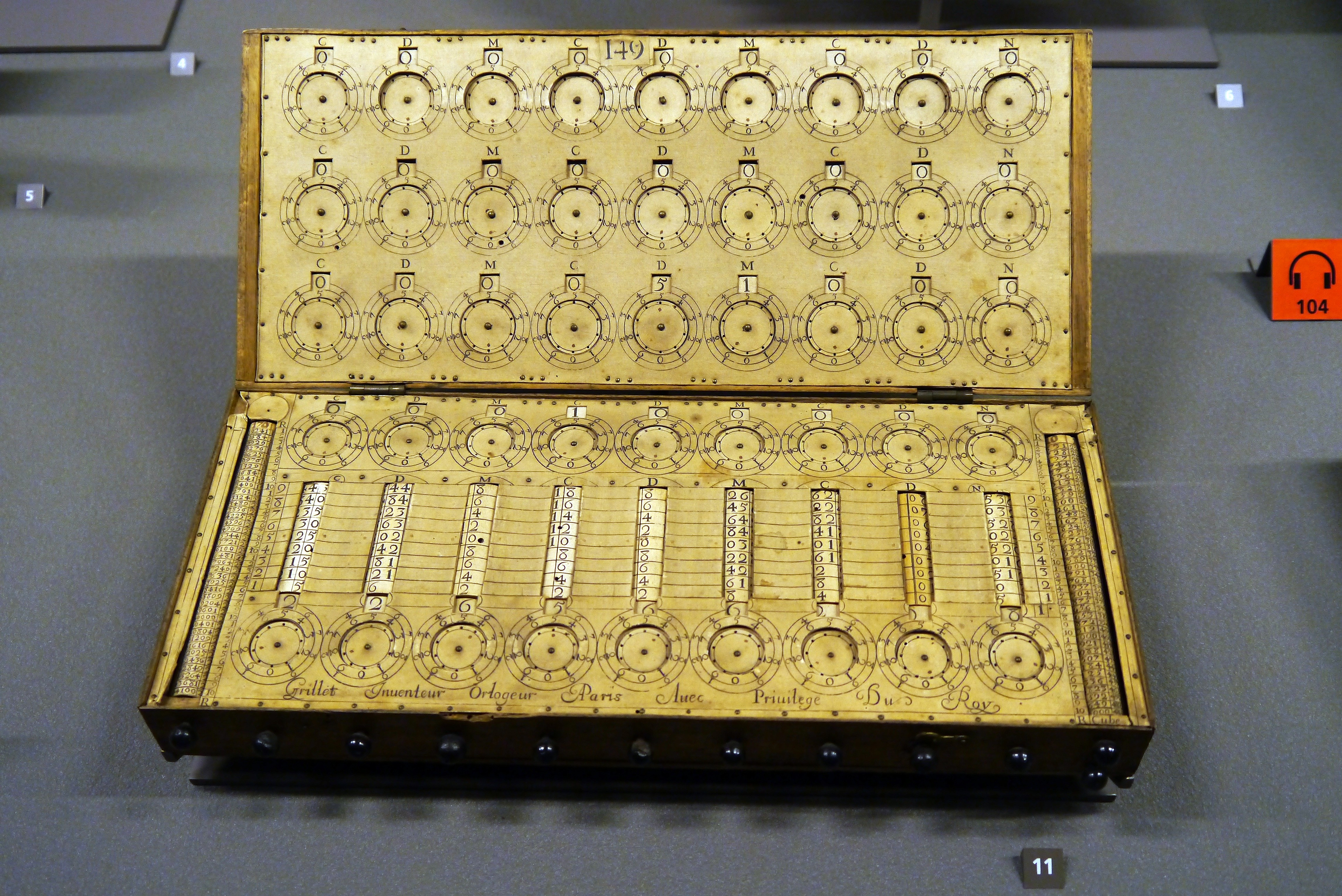
Grillet's arithmetical calculating machine, on display at Musée des arts et métiers.

In 1673 Grillet published a small book, Curiositez mathematiques de l'invention du Sr Grillet horlogeur a Paris, in which he announced the invention of an arithmetical calculating machine. A few years later, in 1678, he wrote a short article in Le Journal des Sçavans describing the machine. According to Grillet, he was inspired by Blaise Pascal's work with calculating machines to combine the Pascaline with Napier's bones, and build a machine that could perform both addition and multiplication.

Grillet displayed his machine at fairs in France and the Netherlands between 1673 and 1681. He tried to establish a business of manufacturing and selling calculating machines, with unclear success.

In addition to the calculating machine, in his career Grillet invented a hygrometer (for which he was accused of plagiarism by another inventor); graphometers; drawing instrument set; protractor, set square, with plumb-bob.

In 1690, the first textile-printing factory in England was established by a Frenchman named René Grillet, who took out a patent on the process.
