= Arithmaurel =

Mechanical calculator

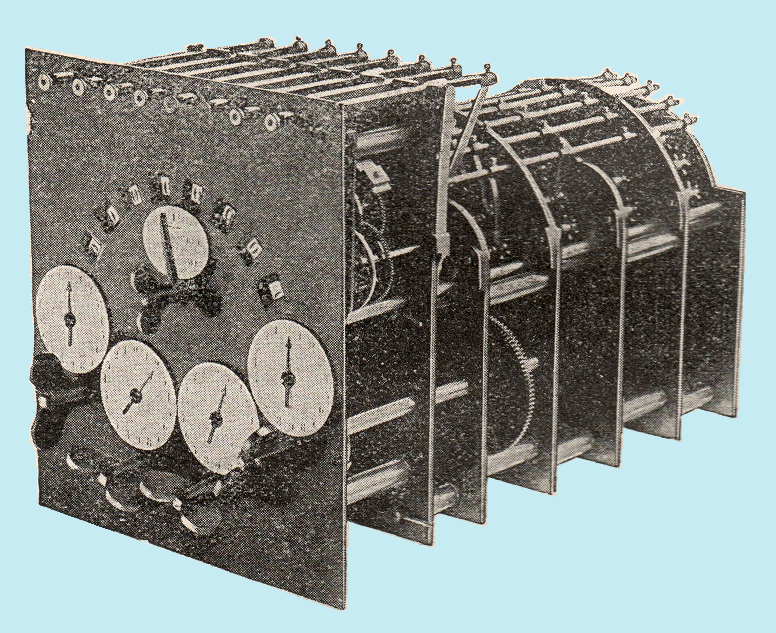
Arithmaurel: the stems at the top are for entering the operands and the dials with their keys are for entering the operators

The Arithmaurel was a mechanical calculator that had a very intuitive user interface, especially for multiplying and dividing numbers because the result was displayed as soon as the operands were entered. It was first patented in France by Timoleon Maurel, in 1842. It received a gold medal at the French national show in Paris in 1849. Its complexity and the fragility of its design prevented it from being manufactured.

Its name came from the concatenation of Arithmometer, the machine that inspired its design and of Maurel, the name of its inventor. The heart of the machine uses one Leibniz stepped cylinder driven by a set of differential gears.

== History ==
Timoleon Maurel patented an early version of his machine in 1842, he then improved its design with the help of Jean Jayet and patented it in 1846. This is the design that won a gold medal at the Exposition nationale de Paris in 1849.

Winnerl, a French clockmaker, was asked to manufacture the device in 1850, but only thirty machines were built because the machine was too complex for the manufacturing capabilities of the time. During the first four years, Winnerl was not able to build any of the 8 digit machines (a minimum for any professional usage) that had been ordered while Thomas de Colmar delivered, during the same period, two hundred 10 digit Arithmometers and fifty 16 digit ones.

None of the machines that were built and none of the machines described in the patents could be used at full capacity because the capacity of the result display register was equal to the capacity of the operand register (for a multiplication, the capacity of the result register should be equal to the capacity of the operand register augmented by the capacity of the operator register).

== Description ==
Following is a description of one of the two machines introduced in the 1846 patent. It has a capacity of five digits for the operator and ten digits for the operand and the result registers.

All the registers are located on the front panel, the reset mechanism is on the side.

- 10 numbered stems, arranged horizontally at the top of the front panel, can be pulled at different lengths to enter the operands with the rightmost stem representing units.
- A 10 digit display register located in the middle is used to display the results.
- 5 dials, each coupled with an input key, are used to enter the operators with the rightmost dial representing units. Turning the units key one division clockwise will add the content of the operand register to the total. Turning the units key one division counterclockwise will subtract the content of the operand register from the current total. Turning the tens key one division clockwise will add 10 times the content of the operand register to the total etc..
