= Willgodt Theophil Odhner =

Swedish engineer and inventor (1845–1905)

- Вильгодт Теофил Однер
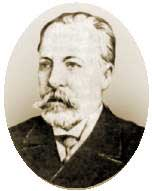
- Born: 10 August 1845; Dalby, Värmland, Sweden
- Died: 15 September 1905 (aged 60); Saint Petersburg, Russia
- Known for: Odhner Arithmometer

Willgodt Theophil Odhner (Russian: Вильгодт Теофил Однер; 10 August 1845 – 15 September [O.S. 2 September] 1905) was a Swedish engineer and entrepreneur, working in St. Petersburg, Russia. He was the inventor of the Odhner Arithmometer, which by the 1940s was one of the most popular type of portable mechanical calculator in the world.

According to a brochure distributed by Odhner's company at the Paris World exposition of 1900 "...Odhner had, in 1871, an opportunity to repair a Thomas calculating machine and then became convinced that it is possible to solve the problem of mechanical calculation by a simpler and more appropriate way". It took him 19 years to perfect the design of this new machine so it could be manufactured effectively.

== Early years ==
Odhner studied at the Royal Institute of Technology in Stockholm from 1864 to 1867 but left before graduating. At age 23, in 1868, he moved to Saint Petersburg, Russia, even though he didn't speak any Russian. As soon as he arrived, he went to the Swedish consulate, which found him a job in a local mechanical workshop. A few months later he joined the Nobel's mechanical factory owned by a Swede named Ludvig Nobel (1831–1888), brother of Alfred Nobel of Nobel Prize fame, where he worked until 1877. In 1878 he joined the Expedition, a large paper mill and printing house, and worked there until 1892.

== Manufacturing of the Arithmometer ==
While working at the Expedition, Odhner started his own workshop in 1885, building high quality production machines for local manufacturing businesses. One of his biggest project was the manufacturing of printing presses, he also made cigarette-making machines and all kind of scientific instruments. Odhner officially started the production of his arithmometer in this workshop in 1890. Early on, Mr. F. N. Hill, a British citizen, became his associate but he left the company around 1897, making Odhner the sole proprietor until his death in 1905.

After Odhner's death, his sons Alexander and Georg and son-in-law Karl Siewert continued the production and about 23,000 calculators were made before the factory was forced to close down in 1918.

Independent clone makers from all over the world, including Russia, carried the design from 1893 well into the 1970s.

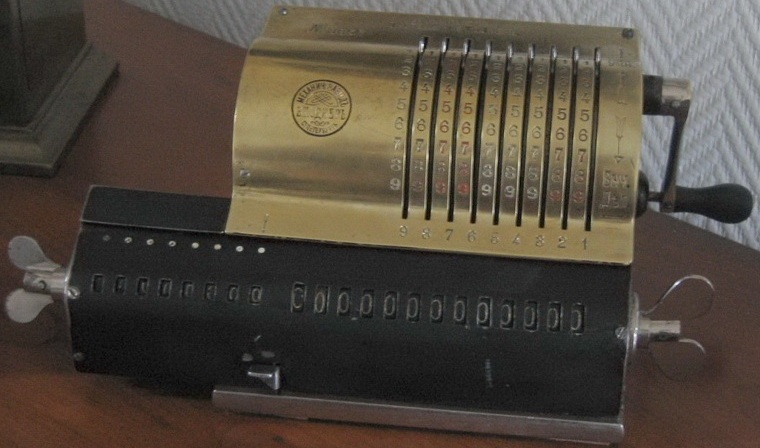
An early machine built by W.T. Odhner in St. Petersburg before 1900

== Family ==
In 1871 he married Alma Skånberg, the daughter of Fredrik Skånberg, a Nobel coworker. They had seven children. Unfortunately Emilia, their second child, died at age 2 in 1877, the same year Alma, their third child was born.

W. T. Odhner died of a heart attack on 15 September 1905 (Gregorian calendar) in Saint Petersburg, Russia.

== See also ==
- Timeline of computing
