= Leibniz wheel =

Component of some mechanical calculators

In the position shown, the counting wheel meshes with three of the nine teeth of the Leibniz wheel.

A Leibniz wheel or stepped drum is a cylinder with a set of teeth of incremental lengths which, when coupled to a counting wheel, can be used in the calculating engine of a class of mechanical calculators. Invented by Leibniz in 1673, it was used for three centuries until the advent of the electronic calculator in the mid-1970s.

Gottfried Wilhelm Leibniz built a machine called the stepped reckoner based on the design of the stepped drum in 1694. It was made famous by Thomas de Colmar when he used it, a century and a half later, in his Arithmometer, the first mass-produced calculating machine. It was also used in the Curta calculator, a very popular portable calculator introduced in the second part of the 20th century.

== Concept ==
By coupling a Leibniz wheel with a counting wheel free to move up and down its length, the counting wheel can mesh with any number of teeth.

The animation on the side shows a nine-tooth Leibniz wheel coupled to a red counting wheel. It is set to mesh with three teeth at each rotation and therefore would add or subtract 3 from the counter at each rotation.

The computing engine of an Arithmometer has a set of linked Leibniz wheels coupled to a crank handle. Each turn of the crank handle rotates all the Leibniz wheels by one full turn. The input sliders move counting wheels up and down the Leibniz wheels which are themselves linked by a carry mechanism.

From the late nineteenth century on, Leibniz stepped drums in purely mechanical calculators were partially supplanted by pinwheels which are similar in function but with a more compact design; stepped drums remained the primary technology for electromechanical calculators until the development of purely electronic calculators.

== Machines built using this principle ==
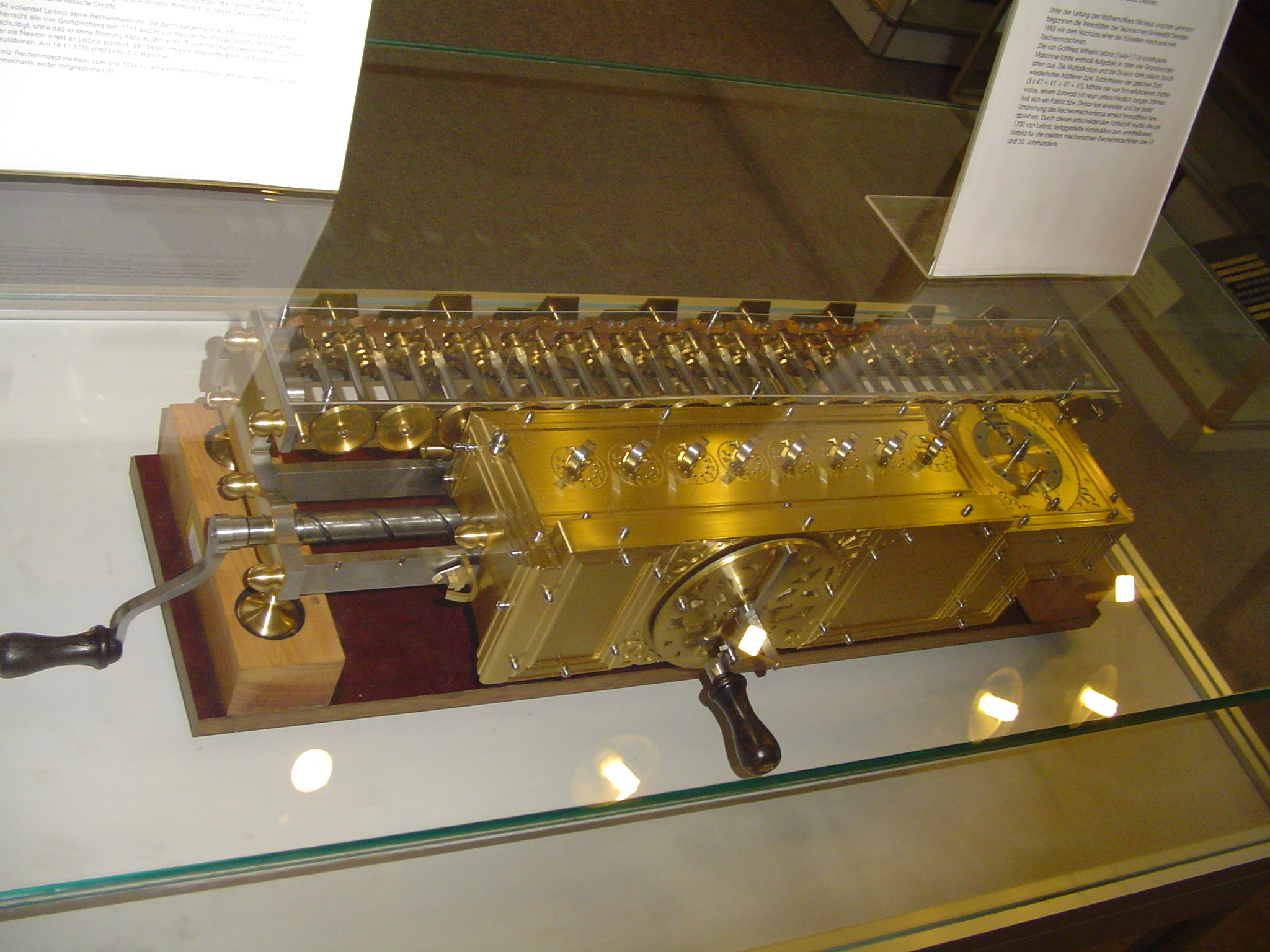
Replica of Leibniz's Stepped Reckoner in the Deutsches Museum.

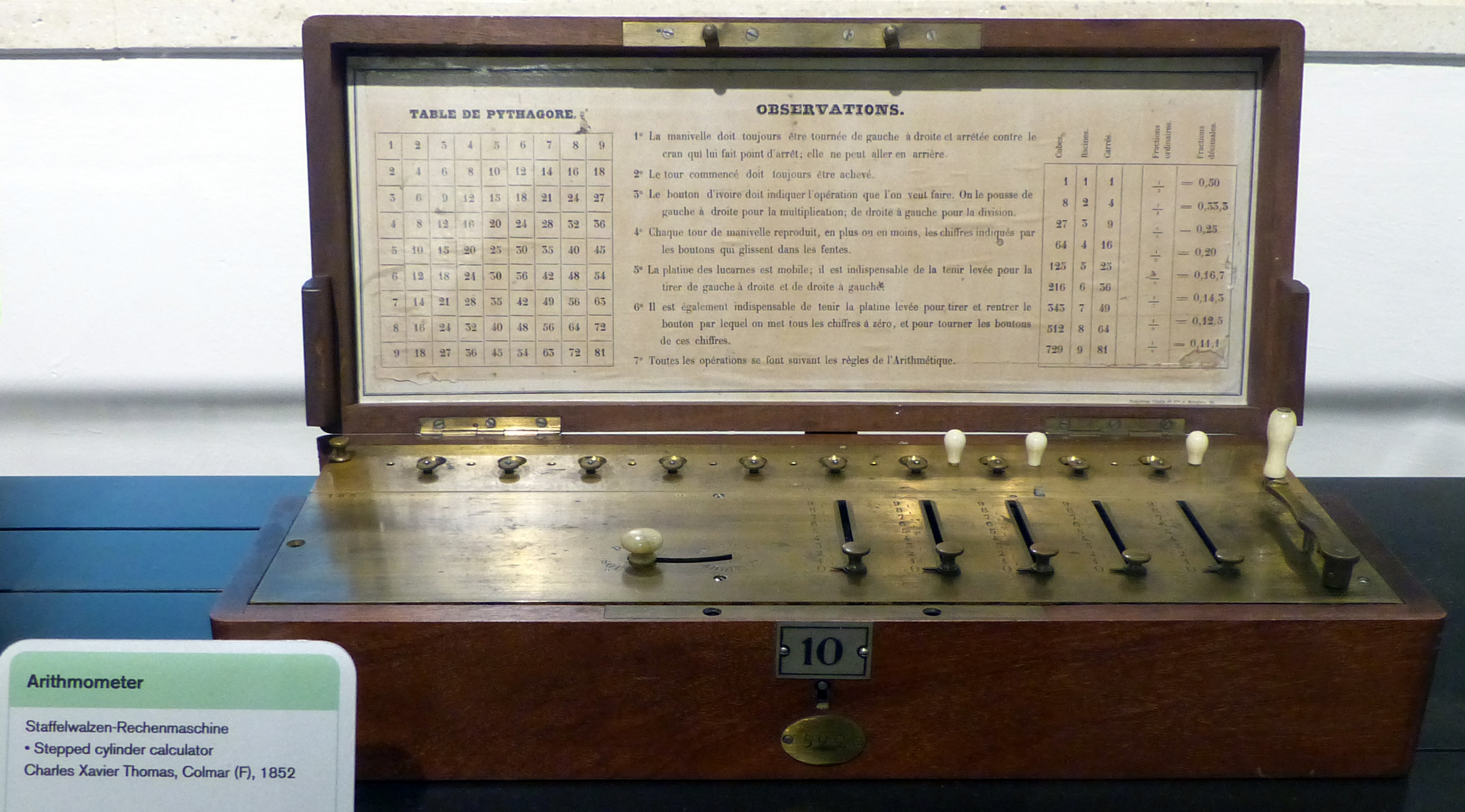
Thomas de Colmar Arithmometer (from 1852, significantly different from his 1820 model) uses Leibnitz stepped drum. Considered by many to be the first largely successful mechanical calculator, and the first to be produced in large numbers (thousands)

- (Germany) – Gottfried Leibniz built his first stepped reckoner in 1694 and another one in 1706.
- (Germany) – Philipp Matthäus Hahn, a German pastor, built two circular machines in 1770.
- (Germany) – J.C. Schuster, Hahn's brother in law, built a few machines of Hahn's design into the early 19th century.
- (United Kingdom) – Lord Stanhope designed a machine using Leibniz wheels in 1777. He also designed a pinwheel calculator in 1775.
- (Germany) – Johann-Helfrich Müller built a machine very similar to Hahn's machine in 1783.
- (France) – Thomas de Colmar invented his Arithmometer in 1820 but it took him 30 years of development before it was commercialized in 1851. It was manufactured until 1915. Louis Payen, Veuve L. Payen and Darras were successive owners and distributors of the Arithmometer.
- (France) – Timoleon Maurel invented his Arithmaurel in 1842. The complexity of its design limited its capacity and doomed its production, but it could multiply two numbers by the simple fact of setting them on its dials.
- – About twenty clones of the Arithmometer were manufactured in Europe starting with Burkhardt in 1878 then came Layton, Saxonia, Gräber, Peerless, Mercedes-Euklid, Archimedes, TIM, Bunzel, Austria, Tate, Madas etc. These clones, often more sophisticated than the original arithmometer, were built until the beginning of World War II.
- (United Kingdom) – Joseph Edmondson invented and manufactured a circular calculator in 1885.
- (United States) – Friden and Monroe calculators used a biquinary variant of this mechanism. Both were made in large numbers; Monroe started early in the 20th century; Friden in the 1930s. (The Marchant used a radically different and unique mechanism.) The variant mechanism worked with digits from 1 through 4 as shown in the animation; digits larger than 4 engaged a five-tooth gear as well as the teeth of the Leibniz wheel. This made it unnecessary for the sliding gear to travel longer distances for the higher-number digits. Otherwise, pressing a 5..9 key would require either a longer stroke (as in a Comptometer) or excessive force combined with a gently sloping cam surface.
- (Austria) – Curt Herzstark introduced his Curta portable calculator in 1948, which remained popular until the introduction of electronic calculators in the 1970s.

== See also ==
- Pascal's calculator

== Sources ==
- Chase, George C (July 1980). History of Mechanical Computing Machinery. Volume 2, Number 3. IEEE Annals of the History of Computing.
- Ifrah, Georges (2001). The Universal History of Computing. John Wiley & Sons, Inc. ISBN 0-471-39671-0.
- de Brabandere, Luc (1995). Calculus (in French). Paris: Mardaga. pp. 114–125. ISBN 978-2-87009-591-1.
- Marguin, Jean (1994). Histoire des instruments et machines à calculer, trois siècles de mécanique pensante 1642-1942 (in French). Hermann. ISBN 978-2-7056-6166-3.
