= Pascaline =

Early mechanical calculator

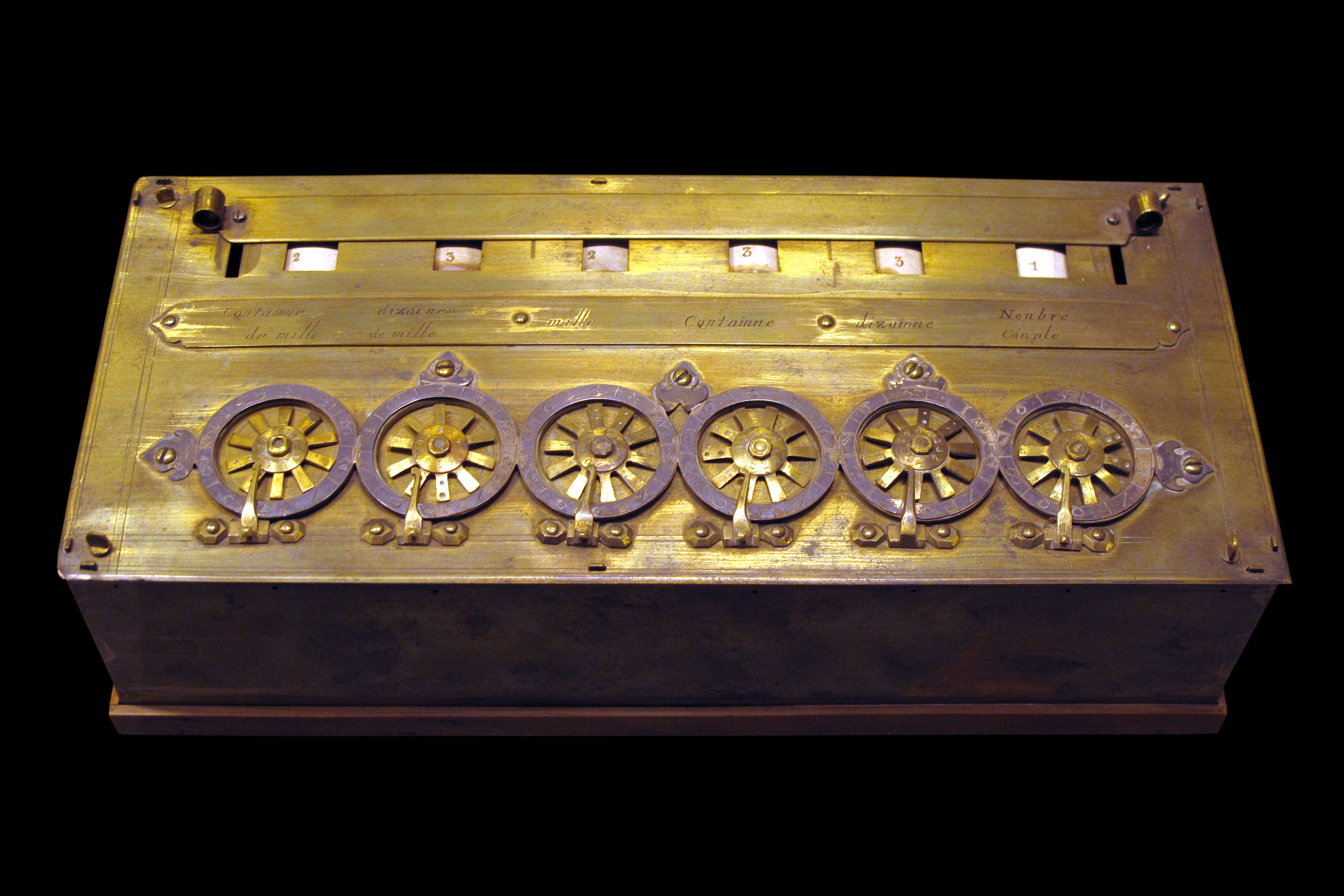
A Pascaline signed by Pascal in 1652

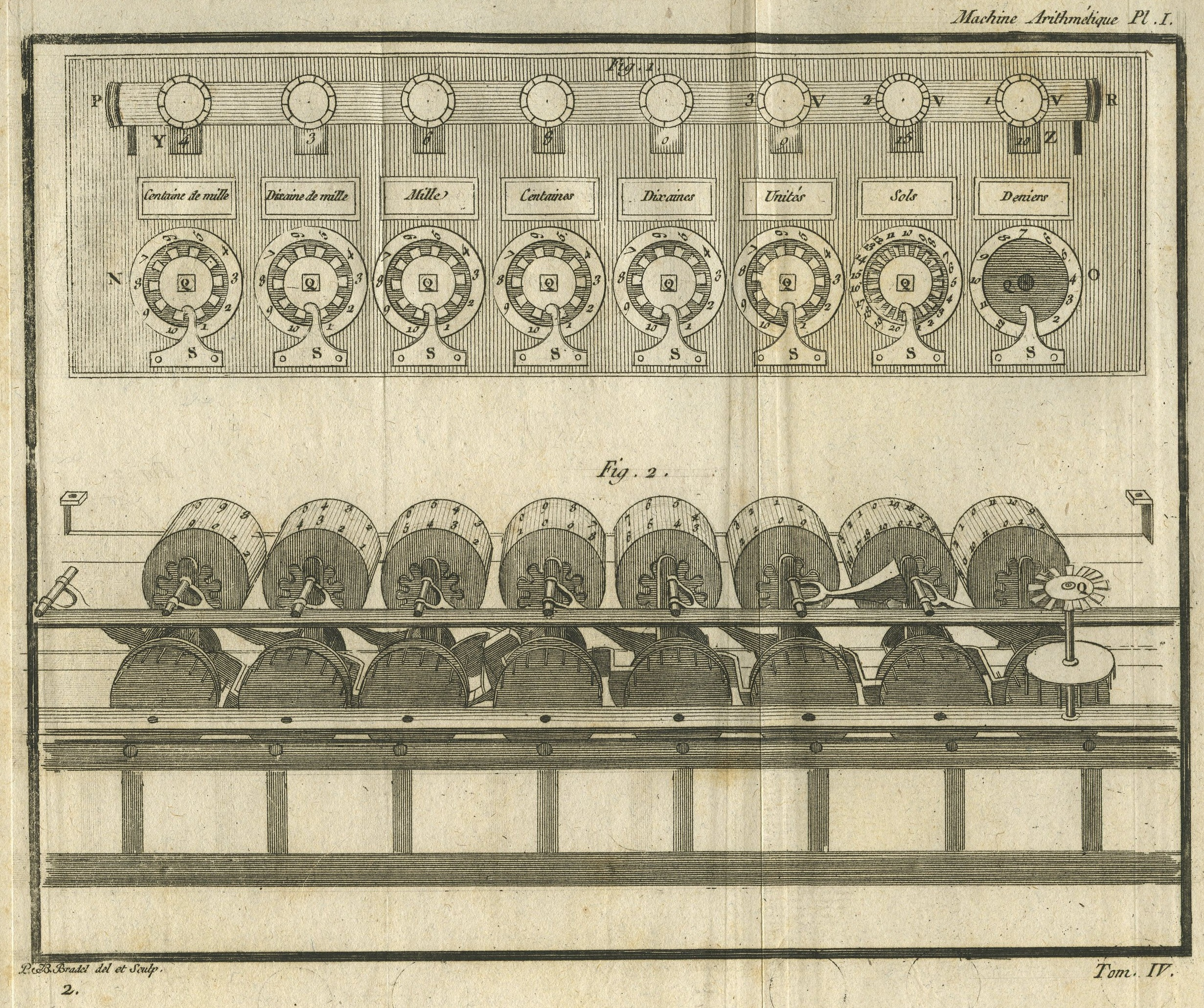
Top view and overview of the entire mechanism. This version of Pascaline was for accounting.

The Pascaline (also known as the arithmetic machine or Pascal's calculator) is a mechanical calculator invented by Blaise Pascal in 1642. It was the first operational mechanical calculator with better tens-carry. Pascal was led to develop a calculator by the laborious arithmetical calculations required by his father's (Étienne Pascal) work as the supervisor of taxes in Rouen, France. He designed the machine to add and subtract two numbers and to perform multiplication and division through repeated addition or subtraction. It used a stylus to perform calculations.

There were three versions of his calculator: one for accounting, one for surveying, and one for science.

The accounting version represented the livre which was the currency in France at the time. The next dial to the right represented sols where 20 sols make 1 livre. The next, and right-most dial, represented deniers where 12 deniers make 1 sol.

Pascal's calculator was especially successful in the design of its carry mechanism, which carries 1 to the next dial when the first dial changes from 9 to 0. His innovation made each digit independent of the state of the others, enabling multiple carries to rapidly cascade from one digit to another regardless of the machine's capacity. Pascal was also the first to shrink and adapt for his purpose a lantern gear, used in turret clocks and water wheels. This innovation allowed the device to resist the strength of any operator input with very little added friction.

Pascal designed the machine in 1642. After 50 prototypes, he presented the device to the public in 1645, dedicating it to Pierre Séguier, then chancellor of France. Pascal built around twenty more machines during the next decade, many of which improved on his original design. In 1649, King Louis XIV gave Pascal a royal privilege (similar to a patent), which provided the exclusive right to design and manufacture calculating machines in France. Nine Pascal calculators presently exist; most are on display in European museums.

Many later calculators were either directly inspired by or shaped by the same historical influences that had led to Pascal's invention. Gottfried Leibniz invented his Leibniz wheels after 1671, after trying to add an automatic multiplication feature to the Pascaline. In 1820, Thomas de Colmar designed his arithmometer, the first mechanical calculator strong enough and reliable enough to be used daily in an office environment. It is not clear whether he ever saw Leibniz's device, but he either re-invented it or utilized Leibniz's invention of the step drum.

== History ==
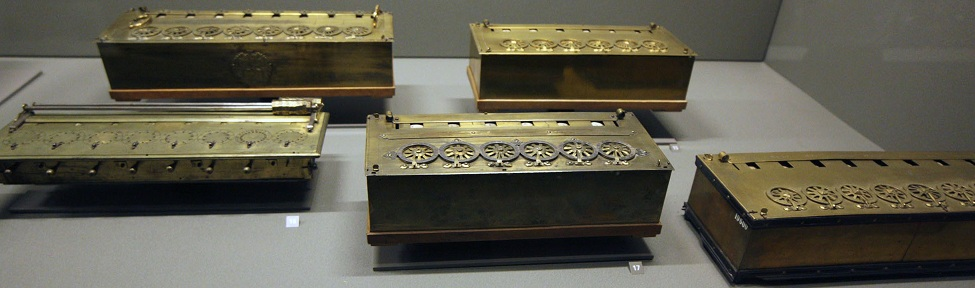
Four Pascalines and a clone from Lépine on display at the CNAM museum in Paris

Blaise Pascal began to work on his calculator in 1642, when he was 18 years old. He had been assisting his father, who worked as a tax commissioner, and sought to produce a device which could reduce some of his workload. Pascal received a Royal Privilege in 1649 that granted him exclusive rights to make and sell calculating machines in France.

By 1654 he had sold about twenty machines (only nine of those twenty machines are known to exist today), but the cost and complexity of the Pascaline was a barrier to further sales and production ceased in that year. By that time Pascal had moved on to the study of religion and philosophy, which resulted in both the Lettres provinciales and the Pensées.

The tercentenary celebration of Pascal's invention of the mechanical calculator occurred during World War II when France was occupied by Germany and therefore the main celebration was held in London, England. Speeches given during the event highlighted Pascal's practical achievements when he was already known in the field of pure mathematics, and his creative imagination, along with how ahead of their time both the machine and its inventor were.

== Operation ==
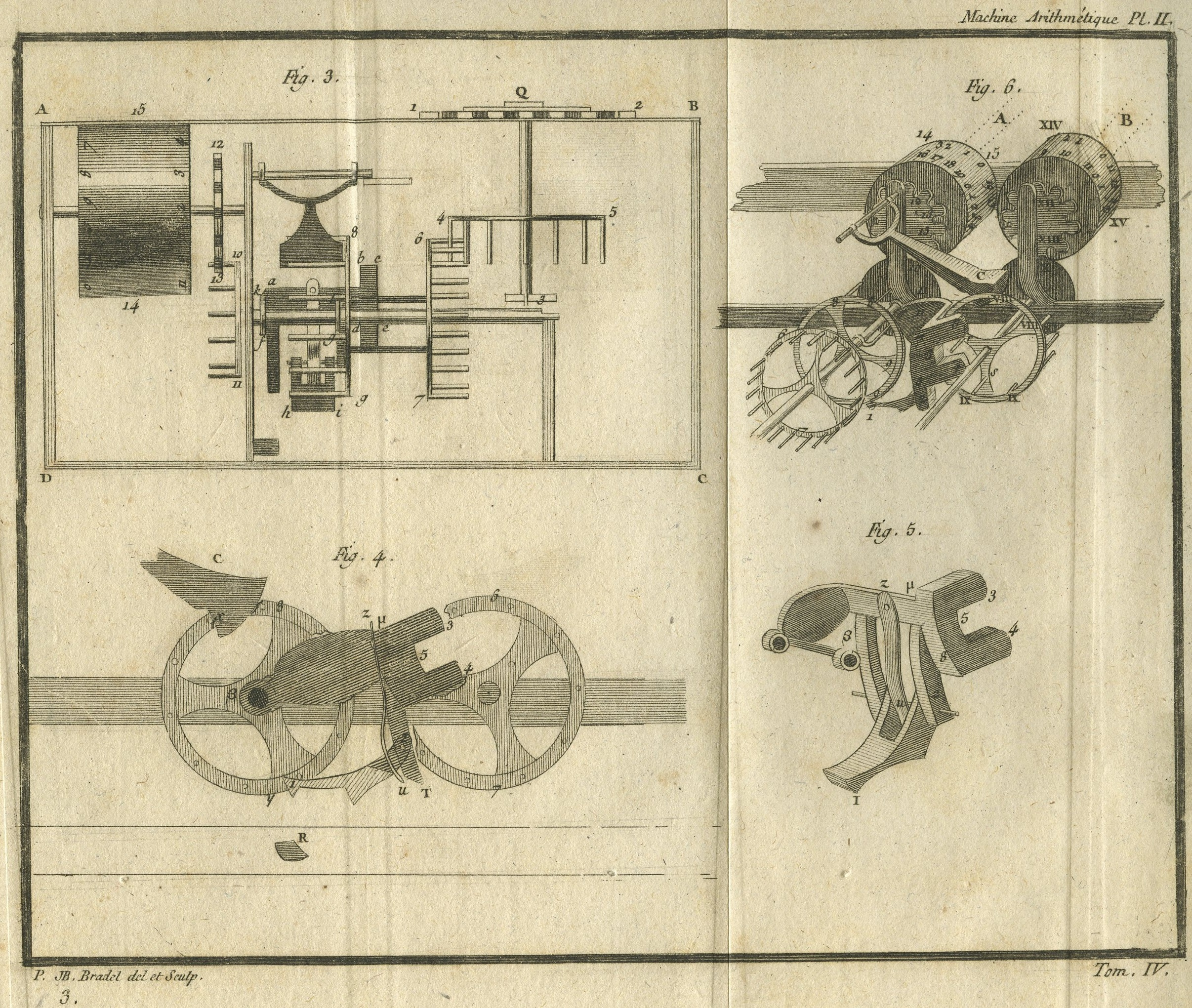
Detail of the carry mechanism and of the sautoir

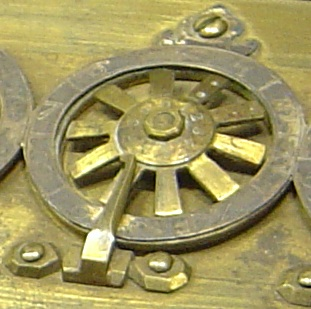
Input wheel

The calculator had spoked metal wheel dials with the digits 0 through 9 displayed around the circumference of each wheel (for base 10 digits). To input a digit, the user placed a stylus in the corresponding space between the spokes and turned the dial clockwise until the metal stop was reached, similar to the way the rotary dial of a telephone is used. This displayed the number in the accumulator at the top of the calculator. Then, one simply dialed the second number to be added, causing the sum of both numbers to appear in the accumulator.

Each dial is associated with a one-digit display window located directly above it, which displays the value of the accumulator for this position. The complement of this digit, in the base of the wheel (6, 10, 12, 20), is displayed just above this digit. A horizontal bar hides either all the complement numbers when it is slid to the top, or all the accumulator numbers when it is slid toward the center of the machine.

Since the gears of the calculator rotated in only one direction, only addition operations could be performed. However, to subtract one number from another, the method of nine's complement was used. The only two differences between an addition and a subtraction are the position of the display bar (accumulator versus complement) and the way the first number is entered (direct versus complement).

For a 10-digit wheel, the fixed outside wheel is numbered from 0 to 9. The numbers are inscribed in a decreasing manner clockwise going from the bottom left to the bottom right of the stop lever. To add a 5, one must insert a stylus between the spokes that surround the number 5 and rotate the wheel clockwise all the way to the stop lever. The number displayed on the corresponding display register will be increased by 5 and, if a carry transfer takes place, the display register to the left of it will be increased by 1. To add 50, use the tens input wheel (second dial from the right on a decimal machine), to add 500, use the hundreds input wheel, etc...

On all the wheels of all the known machines, except for the machine tardive, two adjacent spokes are marked; these marks differ from machine to machine. On the wheel pictured on the right, they are drilled dots, on the surveying machine they are carved; some are just scratches or marks made with a bit of varnish, some were even marked with little pieces of paper.

These marks are used to set the corresponding cylinder to its maximum number, ready to be re-zeroed. To do so, the operator inserts the stylus in between these two spokes and turns the wheel all the way to the stopping lever. This works because each wheel is directly linked to its corresponding display cylinder (it automatically turns by one during a carry operation). To mark the spokes during manufacturing, one can move the cylinder so that its highest number is displayed and then mark the spoke under the stopping lever and the one to the right of it.

Four of the known machines have inner wheels of complements, which were used to enter the first operand in a subtraction. They are mounted at the center of each spoked metal wheel and turn with it. The wheel displayed in the picture above has an inner wheel of complements, but the numbers written on it are barely visible. On a decimal machine, the digits 0 through 9 are carved clockwise, with each digit positioned between two spokes so that the operator can directly inscribe its value in the window of complements by positioning his stylus in between them and turning the wheel clockwise all the way to the stop lever. The marks on two adjacent spokes flank the digit 0 inscribed on this wheel.

On four of the known machines, above each wheel, a small quotient wheel is mounted on the display bar. These quotient wheels, which are set by the operator, have numbers from 1 to 10 inscribed clockwise on their peripheries (even above a non-decimal wheel). Quotient wheels seem to have been used during a division to memorize the number of times the divisor was subtracted at each given index.

=== Inner mechanism ===
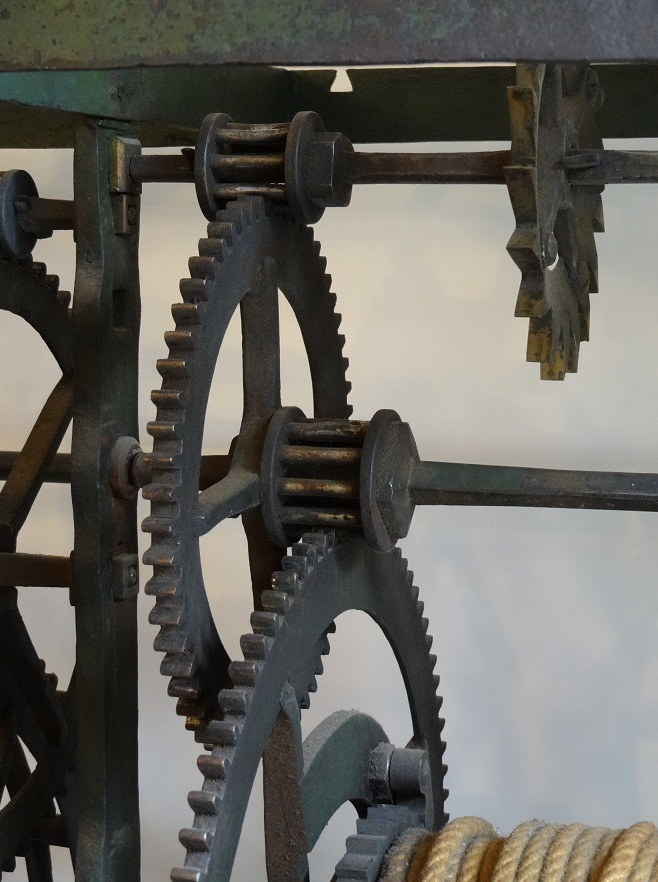
A lantern gear used in turret clocks powered by weights that can weigh hundreds of kilos

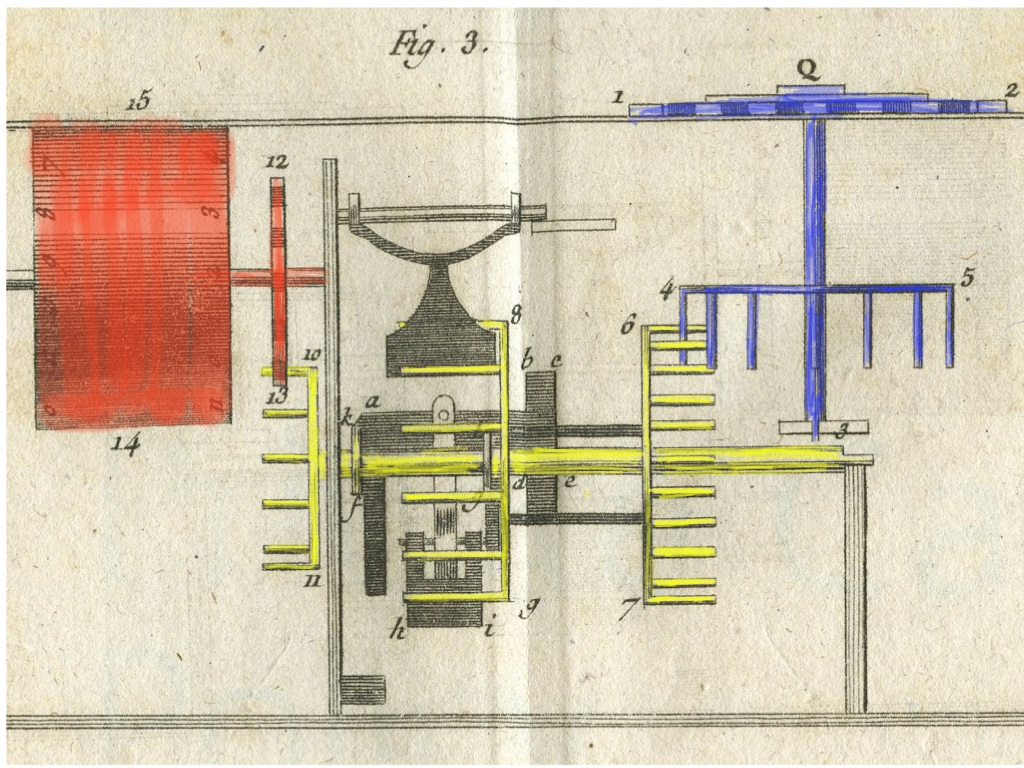
Pascal's adaptation. The blue gear (input) meshes with the yellow gears (processing), which themselves drive the red gear (output). The intersection of two perpendicular cylinders is one point and therefore, in theory, the blue gear and the yellow gear mesh in one single point. Pascal designed a gear that could easily take the strength of the strongest operator and yet added almost zero friction to the entire mechanism

Pascal went through 50 prototypes before settling on his final design; we know that he started with some sort of calculating clock mechanism which apparently "works by springs and which has a very simple design", was used "many times" and remained in "operating order". Nevertheless, "while always improving on it" he found reason to try to make the whole system more reliable and robust. Eventually he adopted a component of very large clocks, shrinking and adapting for his purpose the robust gears that can be found in a turret clock mechanism called a lantern gear, itself derived from a water wheel mechanism. This could easily handle the strength of an operator input.

Pascal adapted a pawl and ratchet mechanism to his own turret wheel design; the pawl prevents the wheel from turning counterclockwise during an operator input, and also acts as a detent to precisely position the display wheel and the carry mechanism for the next digit when it is pushed up and lands into its next position. Because of this mechanism, each number displayed is perfectly centered in the display window and each digit is precisely positioned for the next operation. This mechanism would be moved six times if the operator dialed a six on its associated input wheel.

=== Carry mechanism ===
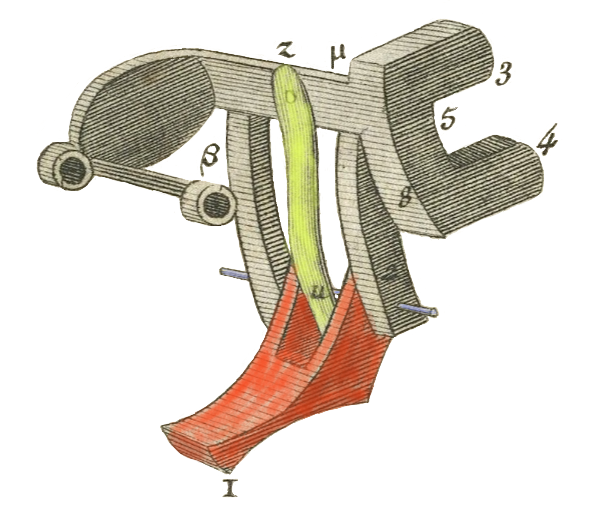
The sautoir

The sautoir is the centerpiece of the Pascaline's carry mechanism. In his "Avis nécessaire...", Pascal noted that a machine with 10,000 wheels would work as well as a machine with two wheels because each wheel is independent of the other. When it is time to propagate a carry, the sautoir, under the sole influence of gravity, is thrown toward the next wheel without any contact between the wheels. During its free fall the sautoir behaves like an acrobat jumping from one trapeze to the next without the trapezes touching each other ("sautoir" comes from the French verb sauter, which means to jump). All the wheels (including gears and sautoir) have therefore the same size and weight independently of the capacity of the machine.

Pascal used gravity to arm the sautoirs. One must turn the wheel five steps from 4 to 9 in order to fully arm a sautoir, but the carry transfer will move the next wheel only one step. Thus, much extra energy is accumulated during the arming of a sautoir.

All the sautoirs are armed by either an operator input or a carry forward. To re-zero a 10,000-wheel machine, if one existed, the operator would have to set every wheel to its maximum and then add a 1 to the "unit" wheel. The carry would turn every input wheel one by one in a very rapid Domino effect fashion and all the display registers would be reset.

The three phases of a carry transfer operation

The carry transmission has three phases:

1. The first phase happens when the display register goes from 4 to 9. The two carry pins (one after the other) lift the sautoir pushing on its protruding part marked (3,4,5). At the same time the kicking pawl (1) is pulled up, using a pin on the receiving wheel as guidance, but without effect on this wheel because of the top pawl/ratchet (C). During the first phase, the active wheel touches the one that will receive the carry through the sautoir, but it never moves it or modifies it and therefore the status of the receiving wheel has no impact whatsoever on the active wheel.
2. The second phase starts when the display register goes from 9 to 0. The kicking pawl passes its guiding pin and its spring (z,u) positions it above this pin ready to push back on it. The sautoir keeps on moving up and suddenly the second carry pin drops it. The sautoir falls of its own weight. During the second phase, the sautoir and the two wheels are completely disconnected.
3. The kicking pawl (1) pushes the pin on the receiving wheel and starts turning it. The upper pawl/ratchet (C) is moved to the next space. The operation stops when the protruding part (T) hits the buffer stop (R). The upper pawl/ratchet (C) positions the entire receiving mechanism in its proper place. During the third phase the sautoir, which no longer touches the active wheel, adds one to the receiving wheel.

== Operation ==
The Pascaline is a direct adding machine (it has no crank) so the value of a number is added to the accumulator as it is being dialed in. By moving a display bar, the operator can see either the number stored in the accumulator or the 9's complement of its value. Subtraction is performed like addition by using 9's complement arithmetic.

=== 9's complement ===
The 9's complement of any one-digit decimal number d is 9-d. So the 9's complement of 4 is 5 and the 9's complement of 7 is 2.

In a decimal machine with n dials, the 9's complement of a number A is:

$$C9(A) = (10^n - 1) -A$$

and therefore the 9's complement of (A-B) is:

$$\begin{align}
C9(A-B) &= (10^n -1) - (A-B)
& = (10^n -1) - A + B
\\
& = C9(A) + B
\end{align}$$

In other words, the 9's complement of the difference of two numbers is equal to the sum of the 9's complement of the minuend plus the subtrahend. The same principle is valid and can be used with numbers composed of digits of various bases (base 6, 12, 20), like in the surveying or the accounting machines.

This can also be extended to:

$$C9(A-B-C-D) = C9(A) + B + C + D$$

This principle applied to the Pascaline:

$C9(A)$	First the complement of the minuend is entered. The operator can either use the inner wheels of complements or dial the complement of the minuend directly. The display bar is shifted to show the complement's window so that the operator sees the direct number displayed because $C9( C9(A) ) = A$.
B	Then the second number is dialed in and adds its value to the accumulator.
$C9(A-B)$	The result (A-B) is displayed in the complement window because $C9( C9(A-B) ) = A-B$. The last step can be repeated as long as the subtrahend is smaller than the minuend displayed in the accumulator.

=== Resetting the machine ===
The machine has to be re-zeroed before each new operation. To reset his machine, the operator has to set all the wheels to their maximum, using the marks on two adjacent spokes, and then add 1 to the rightmost wheel.

The method of re-zeroing that Pascal chose, which propagates a carry right through the machine, is the most demanding task for a mechanical calculator and proves, before each operation, that the machine is fully functional. This is a testament to the quality of the Pascaline because none of the 18th century criticisms of the machine mentioned a problem with the carry mechanism and yet this feature was fully tested on all the machines, by their resets, all the time.

Re-zero	Set all the wheels to their maximum using the marks on two adjacent spokes. Every single wheel is ready for a carry transfer.	0 / 0 / 0 / 0 / 0; 9 / 9 / 9 / 9 / 9
	Add 1 to the right-most wheel. Each wheel sends its sautoir to the next one, the zeros appear one after another, like in a domino effect, from right to left.	9 / 9 / 9 / 9 / 9; 0 / 0 / 0 / 0 / 0

=== Addition ===
Additions are performed with the display bar moved closest to the edge of the machine, showing the direct value of the accumulator.

After re-zeroing the machine, numbers are dialed in one after the other.

The following table shows all the steps required to compute 12,345 + 56,789 = 69,134

Addition	The machine is at zero, the operator enters 12,345.	8 / 7 / 6 / 5 / 4; 1 / 2 / 3 / 4 / 5
	The operator enters the second operand: 56,789. If he starts with the rightmost number, the second wheel will go from 4 to 5, during the inscription of the 9, because of a carry transmission....	3 / 0 / 8 / 6 / 5; 6 / 9 / 1 / 3 / 4

=== Subtraction ===
Subtraction is performed with the display bar moved closest to the center of the machine thereby covering the accumulator value and, instead, showing the 9's complement value of the accumulator.

After being reset, the accumulator would contain all 0's and, therefore, all 9's would be shown in the 9's complement display.

The first number to be entered to perform a subtraction is the 9's complement of the minuend. For example, if the minuend was 7, it's 9's complement is 2 and this value would be dialled in as with addition. The number 7 will appear in the 9's complement display. Another method of entering the 9's complement directly is to simply place the stylus in the 9 value and rotate the dial to the number representing the value to be entered. In this case the dial would be rotated from 9 to 7: the same as entering 2!

Once the minuend has been dialled in, the subtrahends are entered as if being added. The 9's complement display will show the result of the operation.

The accumulator contains $C9( A )$ during the first step and $C9( A-B)$ after adding B. In displaying that data in the complement window, the operator sees $C9( C9( A) )$ which is A and then $C9( C9( A-B ) )$ which is $(A-B)$. It feels like an addition since the only two differences in between an addition and a subtraction are the position of the display bar (accumulator versus complement) and the way the first number is entered (direct versus complement).

The following table shows all the steps required to compute 54,321 − 12,345 = 41,976

Change display space	Move the display bar down to uncover the complement part of each result cylinder. From this point on, every number dialed into the machine adds its value to the accumulator and therefore decreases the total displayed in the complement window.	9 / 9 / 9 / 9 / 9; 0 / 0 / 0 / 0 / 0
Subtraction	Enter the 9's complement of the minuend. The operator can either use the inner wheels of complements or dial the 9's complement of 54,321 (45,678) directly.	5 / 4 / 3 / 2 / 1; 4 / 5 / 6 / 7 / 8
	Dial the subtrahend (12,345) on the spoked metal wheels. This is an addition. The result, 41,976, is in the 9's complement window.	4 / 1 / 9 / 7 / 6; 5 / 8 / 0 / 2 / 3

== Uses ==
Pascalines came in both decimal and non-decimal varieties, both of which can be viewed in museums today. They were designed for use by scientists, accountants and surveyors. The simplest Pascaline had five dials; later variants had up to ten dials.

The contemporary French currency system used livres, sols and deniers with 20 sols to a livre and 12 deniers to a sol. Length was measured in toises, pieds, pouces and lignes with 6 pieds to a toise, 12 pouces to a pied and 12 lignes to a pouce. Therefore, the Pascaline needed wheels in base 6, 10, 12 and 20. Non-decimal wheels were always located before the decimal part.

In an accounting machine (..10,10,20,12), the decimal part counted the number of livres (20 sols), sols (12 deniers) and deniers. In a surveyor's machine (..10,10,6,12,12), the decimal part counted the number of toises (6 pieds), pieds (12 pouces), pouces (12 lignes) and lignes. Scientific machines just had decimal wheels.

Configurations
Machine type	Other wheels	4th	3rd	2nd	1st
Decimal / scientific	base 10; Ten thousands	base 10; Thousands	base 10; Hundreds	base 10; Tens	base 10; Units
Accounting	base 10; Hundreds	base 10; Tens	base 10; Livres	base 20; Sols	base 12; Deniers
Surveying	base 10; Tens	base 10; Toises	base 6 Pieds	base 12; Pouces	base 12; Lignes

The decimal part of each machine is highlighted.

The metric system was adopted in France on December 10, 1799, by which time Pascal's basic design had inspired other craftsmen, although with a similar lack of commercial success.

== Production ==
Most of the machines that have survived the centuries are of the accounting type. Seven of them are in European museums, one belongs to the IBM corporation and one is in private hands.

Location	Country	Machine Name	Type	Wheels	Configuration	Notes
CNAM museum Paris	France	Chancelier Séguier	Accounting	8	6 × 10 + 20 + 12	
CNAM museum Paris	France	Christina, Queen of Sweden	Scientific	6	6 × 10	
CNAM museum Paris	France	Louis Périer	Accounting	8	6 × 10 + 20 + 12	Louis Périer, Pascal's nephew, offered it to the Académie des sciences de Paris in 1711.
CNAM museum Paris	France	Late (Tardive)	Accounting	6	4 × 10 + 20 + 12	This machine was assembled in the 18th century with unused parts.
Musée Henri Lecoq; Clermont-Ferrand	France	Marguerite Périer	Scientific	8	8 × 10	Marguerite (1646–1733) was Pascal's goddaughter.
Musée Henri Lecoq; Clermont-Ferrand	France	Chevalier Durant-Pascal	Accounting	5	3 × 10 + 20 + 12	This is the only known machine that came with a box. This is the smallest machine. Was it meant to be portable?
Mathematisch-Physikalischer Salon, Dresden	Germany	Queen of Poland	Accounting	10	8 × 10 + 20 + 12	The second wheel from the right has a wheel with 10 spokes contained in a fixed wheel with 20 segments. This could be attributed to a bad restoration.
Léon Parcé collection	France		Surveying	8	5 × 10 + 6 + 12 + 12	This machine was bought as a broken music box in a French antique shop in 1942. The only one designed for surveying, it operates with appropriate measurement units (yards, feet, inches, lines)
IBM collection	USA		Accounting	8	6 × 10 + 20 + 12	

== Limits to distribution and controversies ==
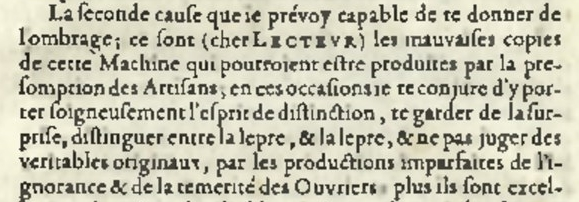
The above is an excerpt from Pascal's letter to the Chancellor of France. When translated to English, it states: “The second cause which I foresee capable of giving you umbrage, are (dear reader) the bad copies of this machine which might be produced by the presumption of the craftsmen: on these occasions, I conjure you to carry carefully the spirit of distinction, to keep you from surprise, to distinguish between leprosy and leprosy, and not to judge of the true originals by the imperfect productions of the ignorance and temerity of the workmen”

Pascal planned to distribute the Pascaline broadly in order to reduce the workload for people who needed to perform laborious arithmetic. Drawing inspiration from his father, a tax commissioner, Pascal hoped to provide a shortcut to hours of number crunching performed by workers in professions such as mathematics, physics, astronomy, etc. But, because of the intricacies of the device, the relationship Pascal had with craftsmen, and the intellectual property laws he influenced, the production of the Pascaline was far more limited than he had envisioned. Only 20 Pascalines were produced over the 10 years following its creation.

=== Intellectual property ===
In 1649, King Louis XIV gave Pascal a royal privilege (a precursor to the patent), which provided the exclusive right to design and manufacture calculating machines in France, allowing the Pascaline to be the first calculator sold by a distributor. Pascal feared that craftsmen would not be able to accurately reproduce his Pascaline, which would result in false copies that would ruin his reputation along with the reputation of his machine. In 1645, in order to control the production of his invention, Pascal wrote to Monseigneur Le Chancelier (the chancellor of France, Pierre Séguier) in his letter entitled "La Machine d’arithmétique. Lettre dédicatoire à Monseigneur le Chancelier". Pascal requested that no Pascaline be made without his permission. His ingenuity garnered the respect of Louis XIV, who granted his request, but it came at a price; craftsmen were not able to legally experiment with Pascal's design, nor were they able to distribute his machine without his permission/guidance.

=== Social context of intellectual collaboration with craftsmen ===
Pascal lived in France during France's Ancien Régime. During his time, craftsmen in Europe increasingly organised into guilds, such as the English clockmakers who formed the Clockmakers guild in 1631, half-way through Pascal's efforts to create the calculator. This affected Pascal’s ability to recruit talent as guilds often reduced the exchange of ideas and trade; sometimes, craftsmen would withhold their labour altogether to rebel against the nobles. Thus Pascal was in a market that had a scarcity of skills and willing workers. Importantly, artisans were not as free as intellectuals to create the machine: Gottfried Leibniz, who built upon Pascal's calculator later in the 17th century, had the progress for his machine halted due to his artisan selling the machine's parts for financial solvency.

Pascal’s own conduct led to difficulty in recruiting artisans for his project. This was rooted by his belief that matters of the mind trumped those of the body. Pascal was not alone, as many natural philosophers of his time had a hylomorphic understanding of the inventing process: ideas precede materialisation, as form precedes matter. This naturally led to an emphasis on theoretical purity and an underappreciation for practical work. As Pascal described artisans: “[they] work through groping trial and error, that is, without certain measures and proportions regulated by art, produc[ing] nothing corresponding to what they had sought, or, what’s more, they make a little monster appear, that lacks its principal limbs, the others being deformed, lacking any proportion.”

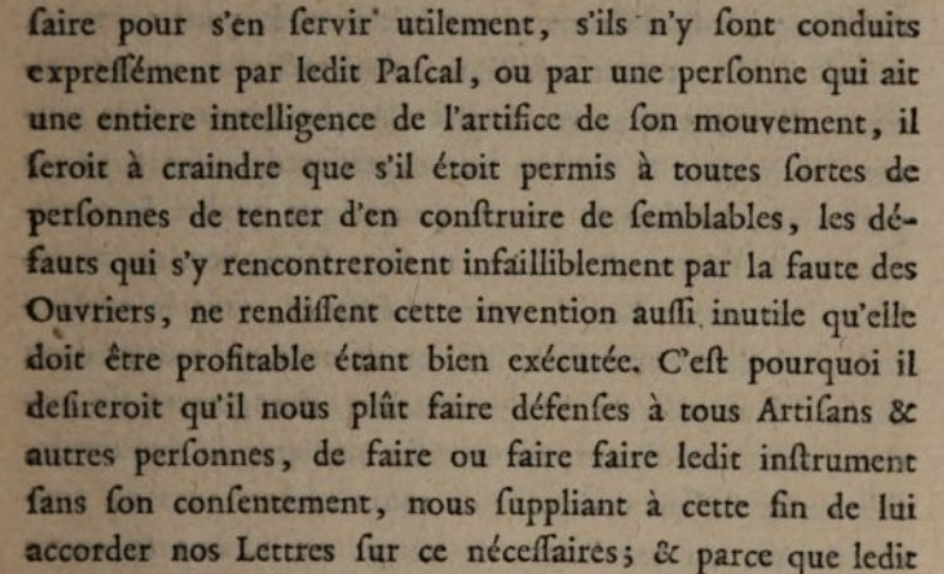
Letter from the French Royal allowing Pascal exclusive rights to his invention. This was arguably the first patent.

Pascal operated his project with this hierarchy in mind: he invented and thought, while the artisans simply executed. He hid the theory from artisans, instead promoting that they should simply remember what to do, not necessarily why they should do it, i.e., until "practice has made the rules of theory so common that [the rules] have finally been reduced into art”. This stemmed from his lack of faith in not only the artisanal work process, but in the artisans themselves: “artisans cannot regulate themselves to produce unified machines autonomously."

In contrast, Samuel Morland, one of Pascal's contemporaries also working on creating a calculating machine, likely succeeded because of his ability to manage good relations with his craftsmen. Morland proudly attributed part of his invention to the artisans by name– an odd thing for a nobleman to do for a commoner at the time. Morland was able to recruit the best talent in Europe. His first craftsmen was the famous Peter Blondeau, who had already received protection and recognition from French statesman Richelieu for his contributions in producing coinage for England. Morland's other craftsmen were similarly accomplished: the third, Dutchman John Fromanteel, came a famous Dutch family who pioneered the pendulum clock.

In the end, Pascal succeeded in cementing his name as the sole creator of the Pascaline. The royal patent states that it was his invention exclusively.

== Achievements ==
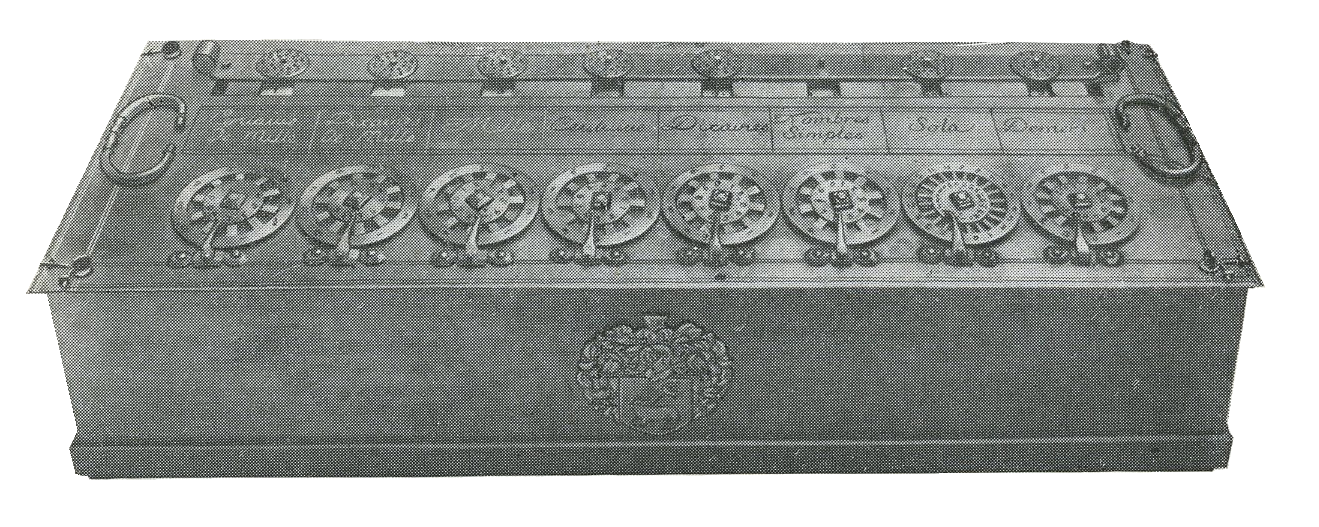
Pascaline made for French currency which once belonged to Louis Perrier, Pascal's nephew. The least significant denominations, sols and deniers, are on the right

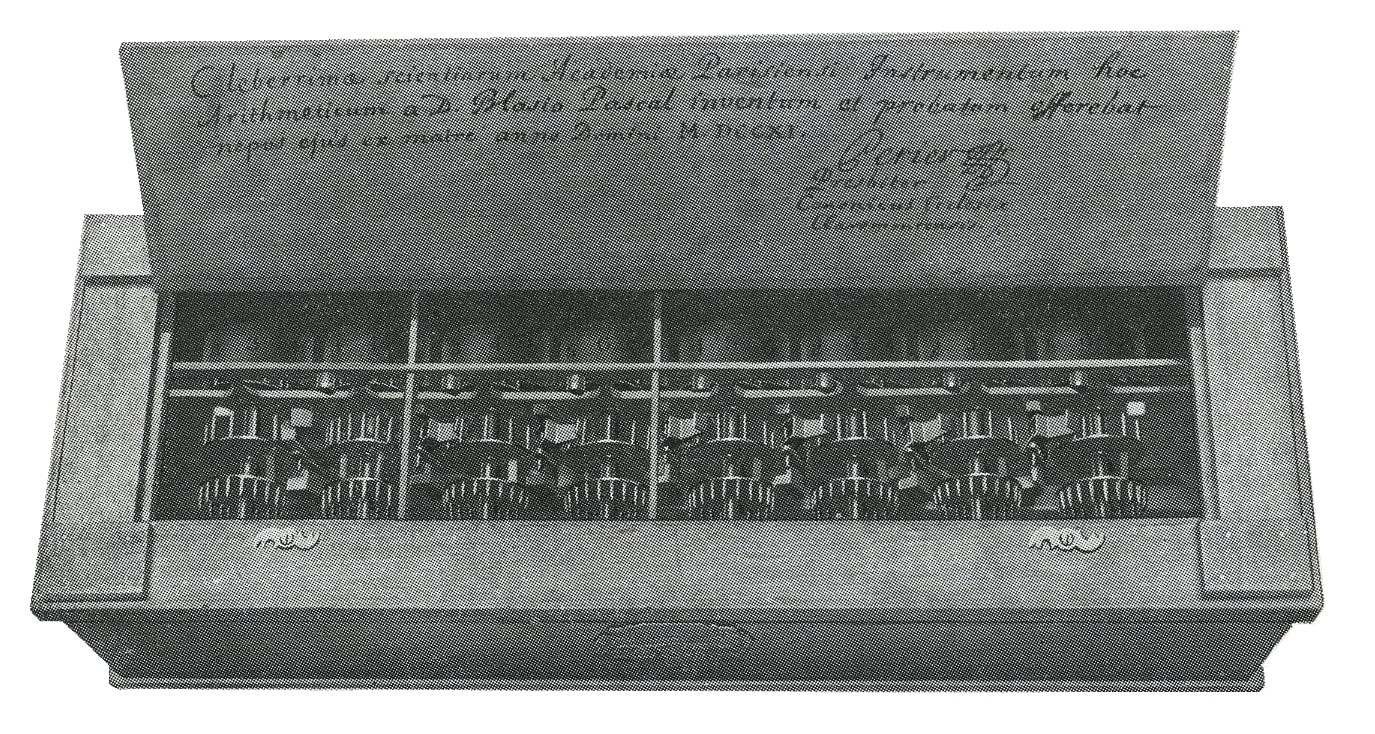
View through the back of the above calculator, showing the wheels

Besides being the first calculating machine made public during its time, the Pascaline is also:

- the only operational mechanical calculator in the 17th century
- the first calculator to have a controlled carry mechanism that allowed for an effective propagation of multiple carries
- the first calculator to be used in an office (his father's to compute taxes)
- the first calculator commercialized (with around twenty machines built)
- the first calculator to be patented (royal privilege of 1649)
- the first calculator to be described in an encyclopaedia (Diderot & d'Alembert, 1751)
- the first calculator sold by a distributor

== Competing designs ==
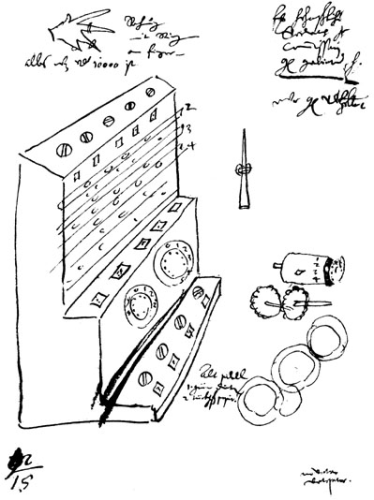
Schickard's calculating clock

In 1957, Franz Hammer, a biographer of Johannes Kepler, announced the discovery of two letters that Wilhelm Schickard had written to his friend Johannes Kepler in 1623 and 1624 which contain the drawings of a previously unknown working calculating clock, predating Pascal's work by twenty years. The 1624 letter stated that the first machine to be built by a professional had been destroyed in a fire during its construction and that he was abandoning his project. After careful examination it was found, contrary to Franz Hammer's understanding, that Schickard's drawings had been published at least once per century starting from 1718.

Bruno von Freytag Loringhoff, a mathematics professor at the University of Tübingen, built the first replica of Schickard's machine but not without adding wheels and springs to finish the design. This detail is not described in Schickard's two surviving letters and drawings. A problem in the operation of the Schickard machine, based on the surviving notes, was found after the replicas were built. Schickard's machine used clock wheels which were made stronger and were therefore heavier, to prevent them from being damaged by the force of an operator input. Each digit used a display wheel, an input wheel and an intermediate wheel. During a carry transfer all these wheels meshed with the wheels of the digit receiving the carry. The cumulative friction and inertia of all these wheels could "...potentially damage the machine if a carry needed to be propagated through the digits, for example like adding 1 to a number like 9,999". The great innovation in Pascal's calculator was that it was designed so that each input wheel is totally independent from all the others and carries are propagated in sequence. Pascal chose, for his machine, a method of re-zeroing that propagates a carry right through the machine. It is the most demanding operation to execute for a mechanical calculator and proved, before each operation, that the carry mechanism of the Pascaline was fully functional. This could be taken as a testament to the quality of the Pascaline because none of the 18th century criticisms of the machine mentioned a problem with the carry mechanism and yet this feature was fully tested on all the machines, by their resets, all the time.

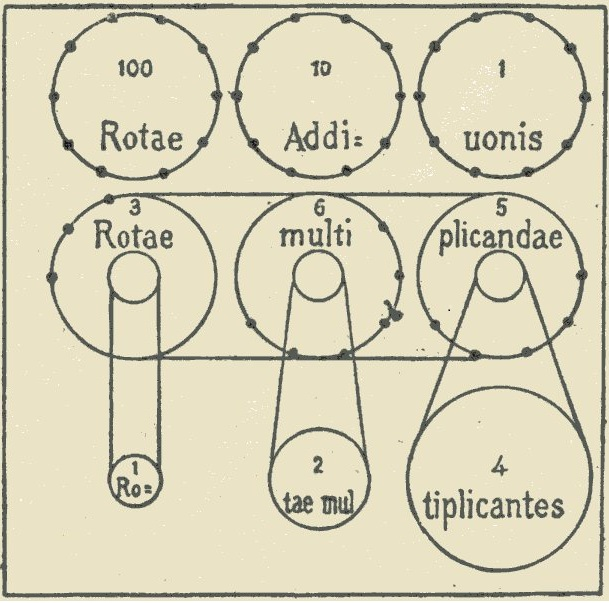
Leibniz' drawing showing 365 multiplied by 124.

Gottfried Leibniz started to work on his own calculator after Pascal's death. He first tried to build a machine that could multiply automatically while sitting on top of the Pascaline calculator, assuming incorrectly that all the dials on Pascal's calculator could be operated at the same time. Even though this could not be done, it was the first time that a pinwheel was described and used in the drawing of a calculator.

He then devised a competing design, the Stepped Reckoner which was meant to perform additions, subtractions and multiplications automatically and division under operator control. Leibniz struggled for forty years to perfect this design and produced two machines, one in 1694 and one in 1706. Only the machine built in 1694 is known to exist; it was rediscovered at the end of the 19th century, having spent 250 years forgotten in an attic at the University of Göttingen.

The German calculating-machine inventor Arthur Burkhardt was asked to attempt to put Leibniz' machine in operating condition. His report was favorable except for the sequence in the carry. and "therefore, especially in the case of multiple carry transfers, the operator had to check the result and manually correct the possible errors". Leibniz had not succeeded in creating a calculator that worked properly, but he had invented the Leibniz wheel, the principle of a two-motion mechanical calculator. He was also the first to have cursors to inscribe the first operand and a movable carriage for results.

There were five additional attempts at designing "direct entry" calculating machines in the 17th century (including the designs of Tito Burattini, Samuel Morland and René Grillet).

Around 1660 Claude Perrault designed an abaque rhabdologique that is often mistaken for a mechanical calculator because it has a carry mechanism in between the numbers. But it is actually an abacus, since it requires the operator to handle the machine differently when a carry transfer takes place.

Pascal's calculator was the most successful mechanical calculator developed in the 17th century for the addition and subtraction of large numbers. The stepped reckoner had a problem in the carry mechanism after more than two consecutive carries, and the other devices had carry mechanisms (one tooth wheel) that were limited in their capacity to carry across multiple digits or had no carry mechanism in between the digits of the accumulator.

Calculating machines did not become commercially viable until 1851, when Thomas de Colmar released, after thirty years of development, his simplified arithmometer, the first machine strong enough to be used daily in an office environment. The Arithmometer was designed around Leibniz wheels and initially used Pascal's 9's complement method for subtractions.

== See also ==
- Adding machine
- Stepped reckoner
- Arithmometer
- Comptometer
- Difference engine
- Analytical engine
- Z1 (computer)

== Sources ==
- Vidal, Nathalie; Vogt, Dominique (2011). Les Machines Arithmétiques de Blaise Pascal (in French). Clermont-Ferrand: Muséum Henri-Lecoq. ISBN 978-2-9528068-4-8.
- Pascal, Blaise (1779). Oeuvres de Blaise Pascal (in French). La Haye: Chez Detune.
- Ellenberger, Michel; Collin, Marie–Marthe (1993). La machine à calculer de Blaise Pascal (in French). Paris: Nathan.
- Mourlevat, Guy (1988). Les machines arithmétiques de Blaise Pascal (in French). Clermont-Ferrand: La Française d'Edition et d'Imprimerie.
- Marguin, Jean (1994). Histoire des instruments et machines à calculer, trois siècles de mécanique pensante 1642–1942 (in French). Hermann. ISBN 978-2-7056-6166-3.
- Taton, René (1949). Le calcul mécanique. Que sais-je ? n° 367 (in French). Presses universitaires de France.
- Taton, René (1963). Le calcul mécanique. Que sais-je ? n° 367 (in French). Presses universitaires de France. pp. 20–28.
- Taton, René (1969). Histoire du calcul. Que sais-je ? n° 198 (in French). Presses universitaires de France.
- Collectif (1942). Catalogue du musée – Section A Instruments et machines à calculer (in French). Paris: Conservatoire National des Arts et Métiers.
- Ginsburg, Jekuthiel (2003). Scripta Mathematica (Septembre 1932-Juin 1933). Kessinger Publishing, LLC. ISBN 978-0-7661-3835-3.
- Needham, Joseph (1986). Science and Civilization in China: Volume 4, Physics and Physical Technology, Part 2, Mechanical Engineering. Taipei: Caves Books, Ltd.
- Ifrah, Georges (2000). The Universal History of Numbers. John Wiley & Sons, Inc. ISBN 0-471-39671-0.
- Ifrah, Georges (2001). The Universal History of Computing. John Wiley & Sons, Inc. ISBN 0-471-39671-0.
- Felt, Dorr E. (1916). Mechanical arithmetic, or The history of the counting machine. Chicago: Washington Institute.
- d'Ocagne, Maurice (1893). Annales du Conservatoire national des arts et métier, 2e série, tome 5, Le calcul simplifié (in French). Paris: Gauthiers-Villars et files, Imprimeurs-Libraires.
- Williams, Michael R. (1997). History of Computing Technology. Los Alamitos, California: IEEE Computer Society. ISBN 0-8186-7739-2.
- Bishop, Morris (1936). Pascal, The life of genius. New York: Reynal & Hitchcock.
- Swedin, Eric G.; Ferro, David L. (2005). Computers: The Life Story of a Technology. Westport, CT: Greenwood. ISBN 0-8018-8774-7.
- Perrault, Claude (1700). Recueil de plusieurs machines de nouvelle invention. Paris, France: Jean Batiste Coignard.
- M.E.P (October 31, 1942). "Pascal tercentenary celebration". Nature. 150 (3809). London: 527. Bibcode:1942Natur.150..527M. doi:10.1038/150527a0.
- Prof. S. Chapman (October 31, 1942). "Blaise Pascal (1623–1662) Tercentenary of the calculating machine". Nature. 150 (3809). London: 508–509. Bibcode:1942Natur.150..508C. doi:10.1038/150508a0.
- "Usage de la machine". Courrier du Centre International Blaise Pascal (in French) (8). Clermont-Ferrand: 4–25. 1986.
