= Difference engine =

Automatic mechanical calculator

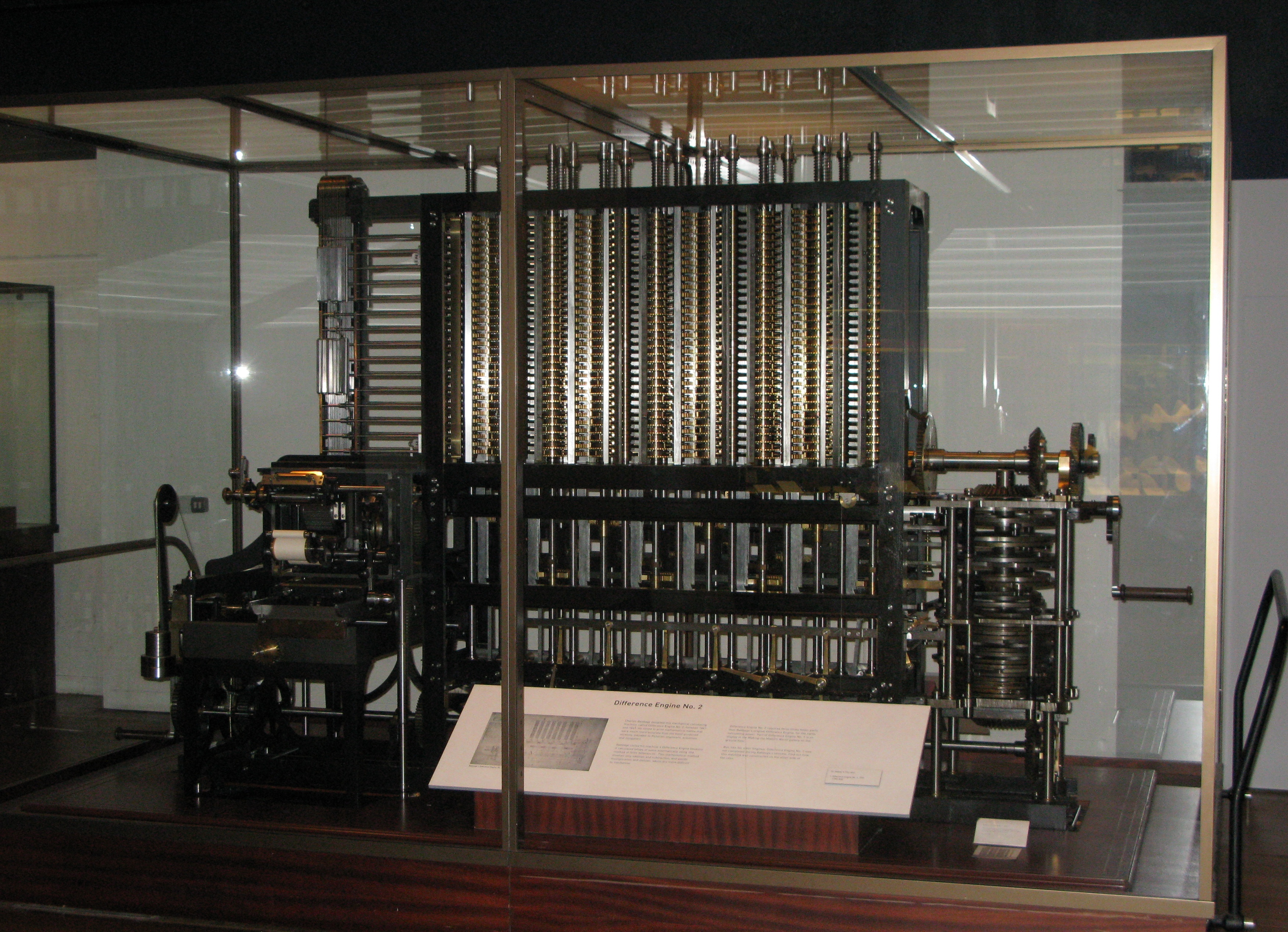
The London Science Museum's difference engine, the first one built from Babbage's design. It has the same precision on all columns, except in calculating polynomials, the precision on the higher-order columns could be lower.

A difference engine is an automatic mechanical calculator designed to tabulate polynomial functions. It was designed in the 1820s, and was created by Charles Babbage. The name difference engine is derived from the method of finite differences, a way to interpolate or tabulate functions by using a small set of polynomial co-efficients. Some of the most common mathematical functions used in engineering, science and navigation are built from logarithmic and trigonometric functions, which can be approximated by polynomials, so a difference engine can compute many useful tables.

== History ==
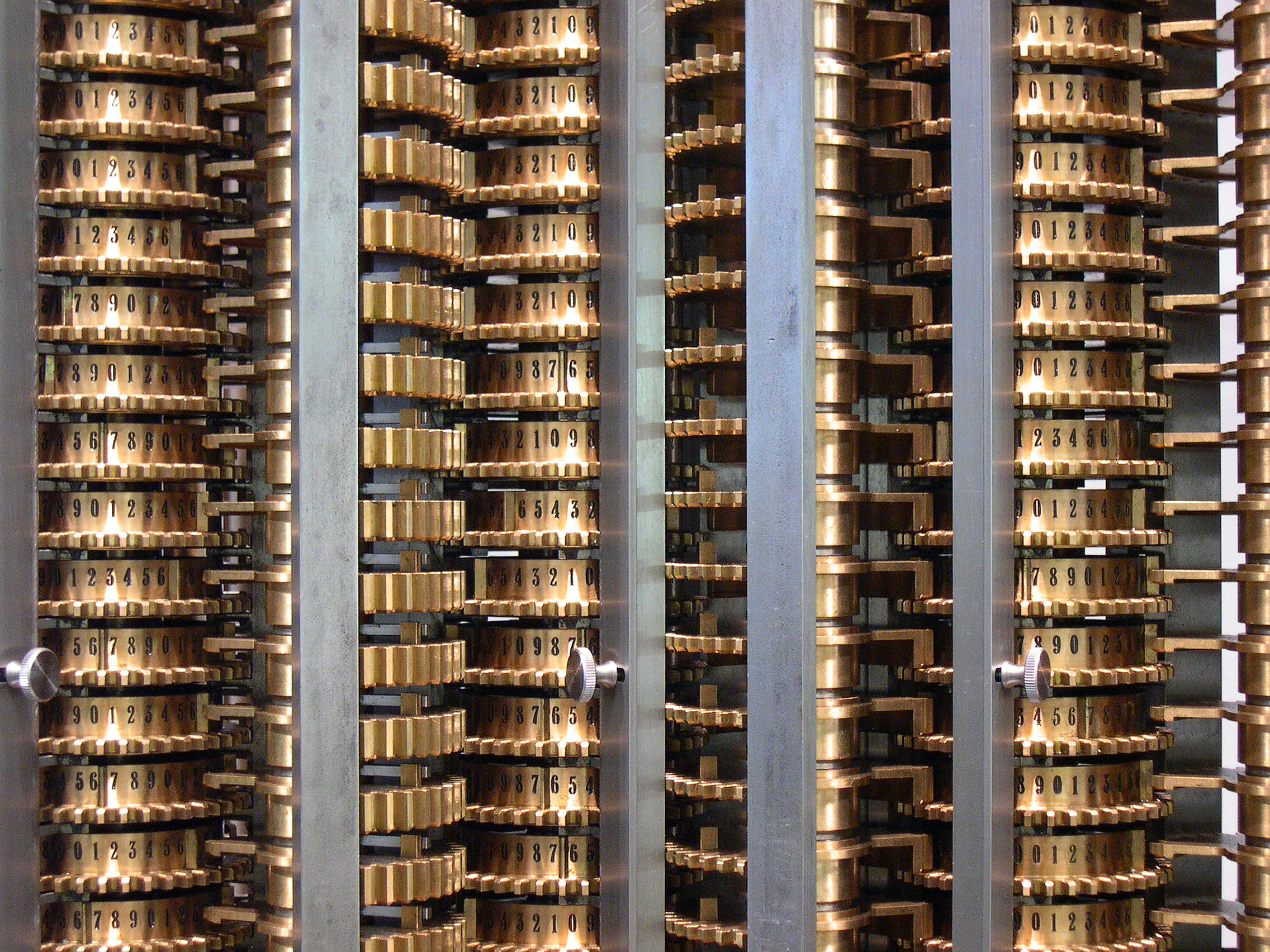
Close-up of the London Science Museum's difference engine showing some of the number wheels and the sector gears between columns. The wheels are constructed in courses that are mirror-images of each other, one counting up from left-to-right and the other counting down from left-to-right. The metal tab between "6" and "7" trips the carry lever in the back when "9" passes to "0" in the front during the add steps (Step 1 and Step 3).

The notion of a mechanical calculator for mathematical functions can be traced back to the Antikythera mechanism of the 2nd century BC, while early modern examples are attributed to Pascal and Leibniz in the 17th century.

In 1784 J. H. Müller, an engineer in the Hessian army, devised and built an adding machine and described the basic principles of a difference machine in a book published in 1786 (the first written reference to a difference machine is dated to 1784), but he was unable to obtain funding to progress with the idea.

=== Charles Babbage's difference engines ===
Charles Babbage began to construct a small difference engine in c. 1819 and had completed it by 1822 (Difference Engine 0). He announced his invention on 14 June 1822, in a paper to the Royal Astronomical Society, entitled "Note on the application of machinery to the computation of astronomical and mathematical tables". This machine used the decimal number system and was powered by cranking a handle. The British government was interested, since producing tables was time-consuming and expensive and they hoped the difference engine would make the task more economical.

In 1823, the British government gave Babbage £1700 to start work on the project. Although Babbage's design was feasible, the metalworking techniques of the era could not economically make parts in the precision and quantity required. Thus the implementation proved to be much more expensive and doubtful of success than the government's initial estimate. According to the 1830 design for Difference Engine No. 1, it would have about 25,000 parts, weigh 4 tons, and operate on 20-digit numbers by sixth-order differences. In 1832, Babbage and Joseph Clement produced a small working model (one-seventh of the plan), which operated on 6-digit numbers by second-order differences. Lady Byron described seeing the working prototype in 1833: "We both went to see the thinking machine (or so it seems) last Monday. It raised several Nos. to the 2nd and 3rd powers, and extracted the root of a Quadratic equation." Lady Byron's daughter Ada Lovelace would later become fascinated with and work on creating the first computer program intended to solve Bernoulli's equation utilizing the difference engine. Work on the larger engine was suspended in 1833.

By the time the government abandoned the project in 1842, Babbage had received and spent over £17,000 on development, which still fell short of achieving a working engine. The government valued only the machine's output (economically produced tables), not the development (at unpredictable cost) of the machine itself. Babbage refused to recognize that predicament. Meanwhile, Babbage's attention had moved on to developing an analytical engine, further undermining the government's confidence in the eventual success of the difference engine. By improving the concept as an analytical engine, Babbage had made the difference engine concept obsolete, and the project to implement it an utter failure in the view of the government.

The incomplete Difference Engine No. 1 was put on display to the public at the 1862 International Exhibition in South Kensington, London.

Babbage went on to design his much more general analytical engine, but later designed an improved "Difference Engine No. 2" design (31-digit numbers and seventh-order differences), between 1846 and 1849. Babbage was able to take advantage of ideas developed for the analytical engine to make the new difference engine calculate more quickly while using fewer parts.

=== Scheutzian calculation engine ===
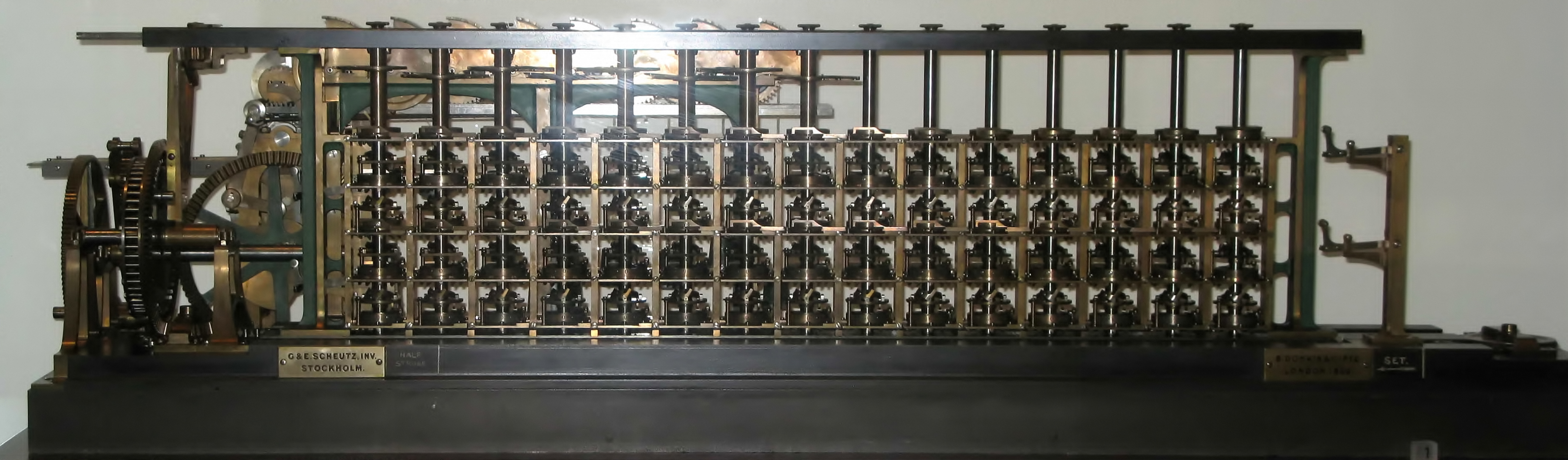
Per Georg Scheutz's third difference engine, in the Science Museum, London

Inspired by Babbage's difference engine in 1834, the Swedish inventor Per Georg Scheutz built several experimental models. In 1837 his son Edvard proposed to construct a working model in metal, and in 1840 finished the calculating part, capable of calculating series with 5-digit numbers and first-order differences, which was later extended to third-order (1842). In 1843, after adding the printing part, the model was completed.

Construction of a larger, improved machine began in 1851 after being funded by the government. It was finished in 1853 and could handle 15-digit numbers and fourth-order differences. The machine was demonstrated at the World's Fair in Paris, 1855, sold to the Dudley Observatory in Albany, New York in 1856, and delivered in 1857. It was the first printing calculator sold. In 1857 the British government ordered the next of Scheutz's difference machines, which was built in 1859. It had the same basic construction as the previous one, weighing about 10 cwt (1,100 lb; 510 kg).

=== Others ===
Around 1859, Martin Wiberg created a machine with the same capacity as Scheutz's (30-digit and sixth-order), with improved construction. He used this device for producing and publishing printed interest tables in 1860 and logarithmic tables in 1875.

Alfred Deacon of London in c. 1862 produced a small difference engine (20-digit numbers and third-order differences).

American George B. Grant started working on his calculating machine in 1869, unaware of the works of Babbage and Scheutz (Schentz). A year later he learned about difference engines and proceeded to design one, describing his construction in 1871. In 1874 the Boston Thursday Club raised a subscription for the construction of a large-scale model, which was built in 1876. It could be expanded to enhance precision and weighed about 2,000 pounds (910 kg).

Christel Hamann built one machine (16-digit numbers and second-order differences) in 1909 for the "Tables of Bauschinger and Peters" ("Logarithmic-Trigonometrical Tables with eight decimal places"), which was first published in Leipzig in 1910. It weighed about 40 kilograms (88 lb).

Burroughs Corporation in about 1912 built a machine for the Nautical Almanac Office which was used as a difference engine of second-order. It was later replaced in 1929 by a Burroughs Class 11 (13-digit numbers and second-order differences, or 11-digit numbers and [at least up to] fifth-order differences).

Alexander John Thompson about 1927 built integrating and differencing machine (13-digit numbers and fifth-order differences) for his table of logarithms "Logarithmetica britannica". This machine was composed of four modified Triumphator calculators.

Leslie Comrie in 1928 described how to use the Brunsviga-Dupla calculating machine as a difference engine of second-order (15-digit numbers). He also noted in 1931 that National Accounting Machine Class 3000 could be used as a difference engine of sixth-order.

=== Construction of two working No. 2 difference engines ===
During the 1980s, Allan G. Bromley, an associate professor at the University of Sydney, Australia, studied Babbage's original drawings for the Difference and Analytical Engines at the Science Museum library in London. This work led the Science Museum to construct a working calculating section of difference engine No. 2 from 1985 to 1991, under Doron Swade, the then Curator of Computing. This was to celebrate the 200th anniversary of Babbage's birth in 1991. In 2002, the printer which Babbage originally designed for the difference engine was also completed. The conversion of the original design drawings into drawings suitable for engineering manufacturers' use revealed some minor errors in Babbage's design (possibly introduced as a protection in case the plans were stolen), which had to be corrected. The difference engine and printer were constructed to tolerances achievable with 19th-century technology, resolving a long-standing debate as to whether Babbage's design could have worked using Georgian-era engineering methods. The machine contains 8,000 parts and weighs about 5 tons.

The printer's primary purpose is to produce stereotype plates for use in printing presses, which it does by pressing type into soft plaster to create a flong. Babbage intended that the Engine's results be conveyed directly to mass printing, having recognized that many errors in previous tables were not the result of human calculating mistakes but from slips in the manual typesetting process. The printer's paper output is mainly a means of checking the engine's performance.

In addition to funding the construction of the output mechanism for the Science Museum's difference engine, Nathan Myhrvold commissioned the construction of a second complete Difference Engine No. 2, which was on exhibit at the Computer History Museum in Mountain View, California, from May 2008 to January 2016. It has since been transferred to Intellectual Ventures in Seattle where it is on display just outside the main lobby.

== Operation ==
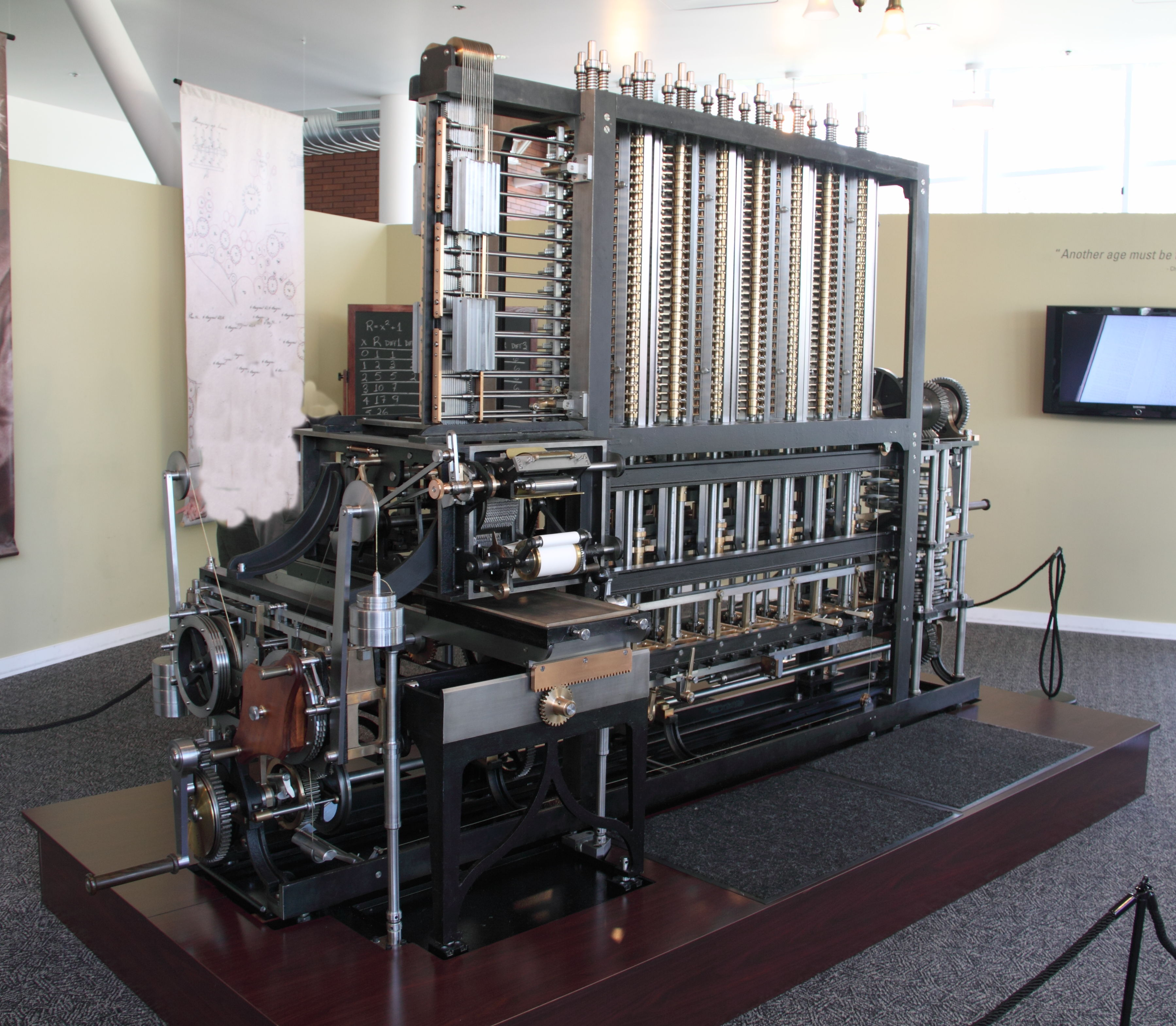
Fully operational difference engine at the Computer History Museum in Mountain View, California

The Mountain View machine in action

The difference engine consists of a number of columns, numbered from 1 to N, each of which stores a number (using base 10). The machine can only add the value of a column n + 1 to column n to produce the new value of n. Column N can only store a constant, column 1 displays (and possibly prints) the value of the calculation on the current iteration.

The engine is programmed by setting initial values to the columns. Column 1 is set to the value of the polynomial at the start of computation. Column 2 is set to a value derived from the first and higher derivatives of the polynomial at the same value of X. Each of the columns from 3 to N is set to a value derived from the $(n-1)$ first and higher derivatives of the polynomial.

=== Timing ===
In the Babbage design, one iteration (i.e. one full set of addition and carry operations) happens for each rotation of the main shaft. Odd and even columns alternately perform an addition in one cycle. The sequence of operations for column $n$ is thus:

1. Count up, receiving the value from column $n+1$ (Addition step)
2. Perform carry propagation on the counted up value
3. Count down to zero, adding to column $n-1$
4. Reset the counted-down value to its original value

Steps 1,2,3,4 occur for every odd column, while steps 3,4,1,2 occur for every even column.

While Babbage's original design placed the crank directly on the main shaft, it was later realized that the force required to crank the machine would have been too great for a human to handle comfortably. Therefore, the two models that were built incorporate a 4:1 reduction gear at the crank, and four revolutions of the crank are required to perform one full cycle.

=== Steps ===
Each iteration creates a new result, and is accomplished in four steps corresponding to four complete turns of the handle shown at the far right in the picture below. The four steps are:

1. All even numbered columns (2,4,6,8) are added to all odd numbered columns (1,3,5,7) simultaneously. An interior sweep arm turns each even column to cause whatever number is on each wheel to count down to zero. As a wheel turns to zero, it transfers its value to a sector gear located between the odd/even columns. These values are transferred to the odd column causing them to count up. Any odd column value that passes from "9" to "0" activates a carry lever.
2. For the odd columns, any carry levers in the activated state cause the adjacent digit to be incremented by 1. This carry operation is applied sequentially to allow carries to propagate. Meanwhile, the even columns are returned to their original values.
3. This is like Step 1, except it is odd columns (3,5,7) added to even columns (2,4,6), and column one has its values transferred by a sector gear to the print mechanism on the left end of the engine. Any even column value that passes from "9" to "0" activates a carry lever. The column 1 value, the result for the polynomial, is sent to the attached printer mechanism.
4. This is like Step 2, but for doing carries on even columns, and returning odd columns to their original values.

=== Subtraction ===
The engine represents negative numbers as ten's complements. Subtraction amounts to addition of a negative number. This works in the same manner that modern computers perform subtraction, known as two's complement.

== Method of differences ==
The principle of a difference engine is Newton's method of divided differences. If the initial value of a polynomial (and of its finite differences) is calculated by some means for some value of X, the difference engine can calculate any number of nearby values, using the method generally known as the method of finite differences. For example, consider the quadratic polynomial

$$p(x) = 2x^2 - 3x + 2 \,$$

with the goal of tabulating the values p(0), p(1), p(2), p(3), p(4), and so forth. The table below is constructed as follows: the second column contains the values of the polynomial, the third column contains the differences of the two left neighbors in the second column, and the fourth column contains the differences of the two neighbors in the third column:

x	p(x) = 2x^{2} − 3x + 2	diff1(x) = ( p(x + 1) − p(x) )	diff2(x) = ( diff1(x + 1) − diff1(x) )
0	2	−1	4
1	1	3	4
2	4	7	4
3	11	11	
4	22		

The numbers in the third values-column are constant. In fact, by starting with any polynomial of degree n, the column number n + 1 will always be constant. This is the crucial fact behind the success of the method.

This table was built from left to right, but it is possible to continue building it from right to left down a diagonal in order to compute more values. To calculate p(5) use the values from the lowest diagonal. Start with the fourth column constant value of 4 and copy it down the column. Then continue the third column by adding 4 to 11 to get 15. Next continue the second column by taking its previous value, 22 and adding the 15 from the third column. Thus p(5) is 22 + 15 = 37. In order to compute p(6), we iterate the same algorithm on the p(5) values: take 4 from the fourth column, add that to the third column's value 15 to get 19, then add that to the second column's value 37 to get 56, which is p(6). This process may be continued ad infinitum. The values of the polynomial are produced without ever having to multiply. A difference engine only needs to be able to add. From one loop to the next, it needs to store 2 numbers—in this example (the last elements in the first and second columns). To tabulate polynomials of degree n, one needs sufficient storage to hold n numbers.

Babbage's difference engine No. 2, finally built in 1991, can hold 8 numbers of 31 decimal digits each and can thus tabulate 7th degree polynomials to that precision. The best machines from Scheutz could store 4 numbers with 15 digits each.

== Initial values ==
The initial values of columns can be calculated by first manually calculating N consecutive values of the function and by backtracking (i.e. calculating the required differences).

Col $1_0$ gets the value of the function at the start of computation $f(0)$. Col $2_0$ is the difference between $f(1)$ and $f(0)$...

If the function to be calculated is a polynomial function, expressed as

$$f(x) = a_n x^n + a_{n-1} x^{n-1} + \cdots + a_2 x^2 + a_1 x + a_0 \,$$

the initial values can be calculated directly from the constant coefficients a_{0}, a_{1},a_{2}, ..., a_{n} without calculating any data points. The initial values are thus:

- Col $1_0$ = a_{0}
- Col $2_0$ = a_{1} + a_{2} + a_{3} + a_{4} + ... + a_{n}
- Col $3_0$ = 2a_{2} + 6a_{3} + 14a_{4} + 30a_{5} + ...
- Col $4_0$ = 6a_{3} + 36a_{4} + 150a_{5} + ...
- Col $5_0$ = 24a_{4} + 240a_{5} + ...
- Col $6_0$ = 120a_{5} + ...
- $...$

=== Use of derivatives ===
Many commonly used functions are analytic functions, which can be expressed as power series, for example as a Taylor series. The initial values can be calculated to any degree of accuracy; if done correctly the engine will give exact results for first N steps. After that, the engine will only give an approximation of the function.

The Taylor series expresses the function as a sum obtained from its derivatives at one point. For many functions the higher derivatives are trivial to obtain; for instance, the sine function at 0 has values of 0 or $\pm1$ for all derivatives. Setting 0 as the start of computation we get the simplified Maclaurin series

$$\sum_{n=0}^{\infin} \frac{f^{(n)}(0)}{n!}\  x^{n}$$

The same method of calculating the initial values from the coefficients can be used as for polynomial functions. The polynomial constant coefficients will now have the value

$$a_n \equiv \frac{f^{(n)}(0)}{n!}$$

=== Curve fitting ===
The problem with the methods described above is that errors will accumulate and the series will tend to diverge from the true function. A solution which guarantees a constant maximum error is to use curve fitting. A minimum of N values are calculated evenly spaced along the range of the desired calculations. Using a curve fitting technique like Gaussian reduction an N−1th degree polynomial interpolation of the function is found. With the optimized polynomial, the initial values can be calculated as above.

== See also ==
- Allan G. Bromley
- Johann Helfrich von Müller
- History of computing
- History of computing hardware
- Logical machine
- Martin Wiberg
- Pinwheel calculator
- Timeline of computing hardware before 1950
