= Doron Swade =

South-African–British computer historian (born 1944)

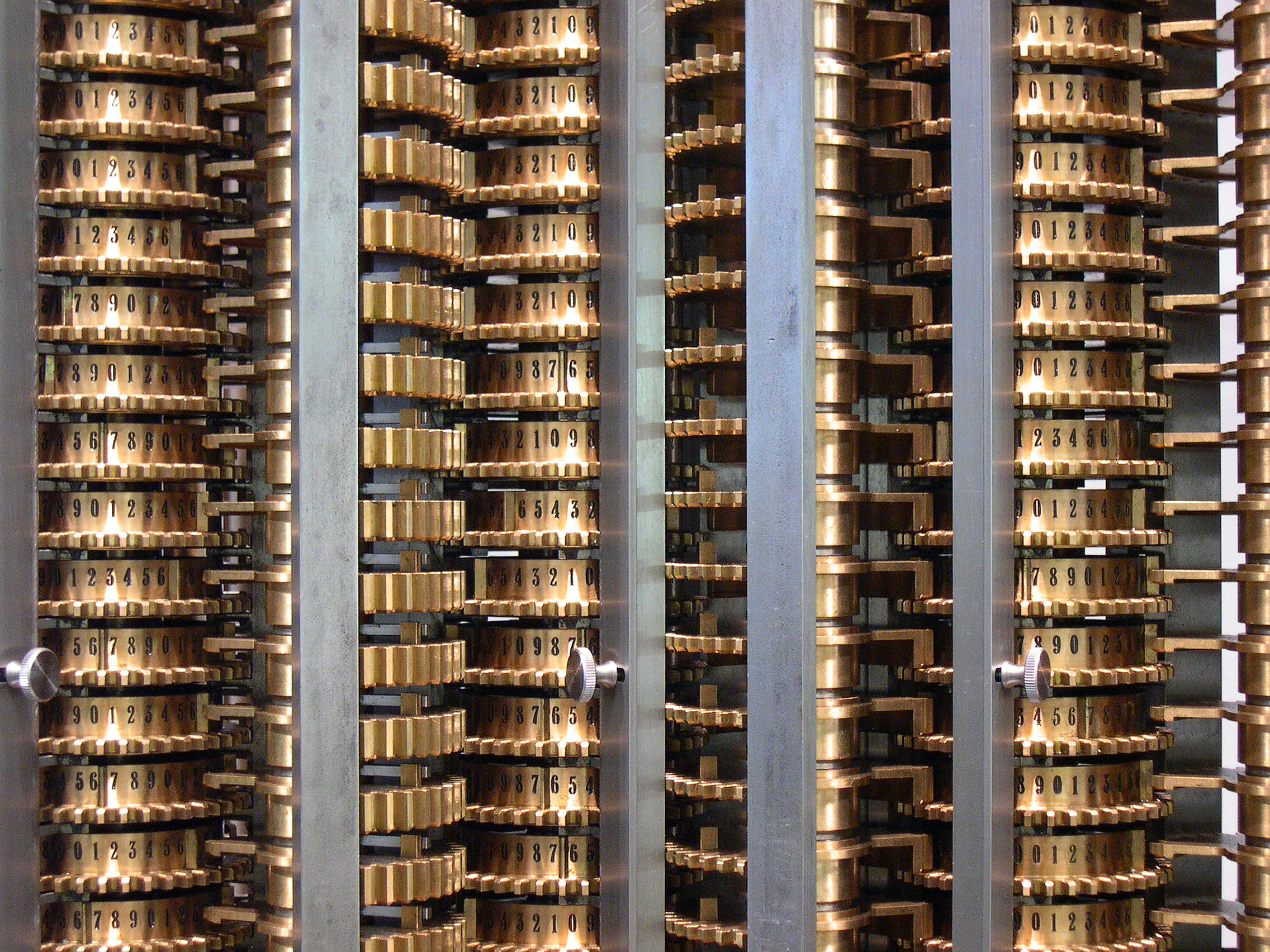
Charles Babbage's Difference Engine in the Science Museum (London), built on a project led by Doron Swade.

Doron Swade MBE, born 1946, is a museum curator and author, specialising in the history of computing. He is especially known for his work on the computer pioneer Charles Babbage and his Difference Engine.

== Life ==
Swade is originally from South Africa. He has studied electronics engineering, history, machine intelligence, philosophy of science and physics at a number of universities including the University of Cape Town, University of Cambridge, and University College London (UCL). He holds a BSc in physics and electronics engineering, an MSc in control engineering, and a PhD in the history of computing from UCL.

He has been a curator at the Science Museum in London, England, and the Computer History Museum in Silicon Valley, California, United States, where he worked on an exhibit on relational databases. At the Science Museum, he curated the computing and electronics collections and rose to be Assistant Director and Head of Collections. His major project at the museum was to organise the construction of Charles Babbage's Difference Engine, in collaboration with Dr Allan Bromley who studied Babbage's original drawings at the Science Museum.

In 1989, Swade was a co-founder of the Computer Conservation Society, a specialist group of the British Computer Society (BCS), with regular meetings at the Science Museum. He is a Fellow of the BCS and a Chartered Engineer.

Swade is a visiting professor in the history of computing at the University of Portsmouth, UK. He is also an honorary research fellow in computer science at Royal Holloway, University of London.

He appeared in the In Our Time program on Ada Lovelace, a collaborator with Charles Babbage, broadcast on BBC Radio 4 in 2008.

Swade was awarded an MBE for services to the history of computing in the UK New Year Honours 2009 list.

Since 2010, Swade has been involved with the Plan 28 project to understand whether Babbage's Analytical Engine was a feasible computer based on Babbage's work, and to build a simulation.

== Bibliography ==
Swade has written the following books:

- The Dream Machine: Exploring the Computer Age, 1991. BBC Books, 1993. With Jon Palfreman. ISBN 978-0-563-36992-9.
- Charles Babbage and his Calculating Engines, Science Museum, London, 1998. ISBN 978-0-901805-45-4.
- The Cogwheel Brain, Abacus, 2001. ISBN 978-0-349-11239-8.
- The Difference Engine: Charles Babbage and the Quest to Build the First Computer, Penguin Putnam, 2001. ISBN 978-0-670-91020-5. Penguin Books, 2002. ISBN 978-0-14-200144-8.
- The History of Computing: A Very Short Introduction, Oxford University Press, 2022. ISBN 9780198831754.

Swade also writes detective novels.
