= Allan G. Bromley =

Australian historian of computing (1947–2002)

Allan George Bromley
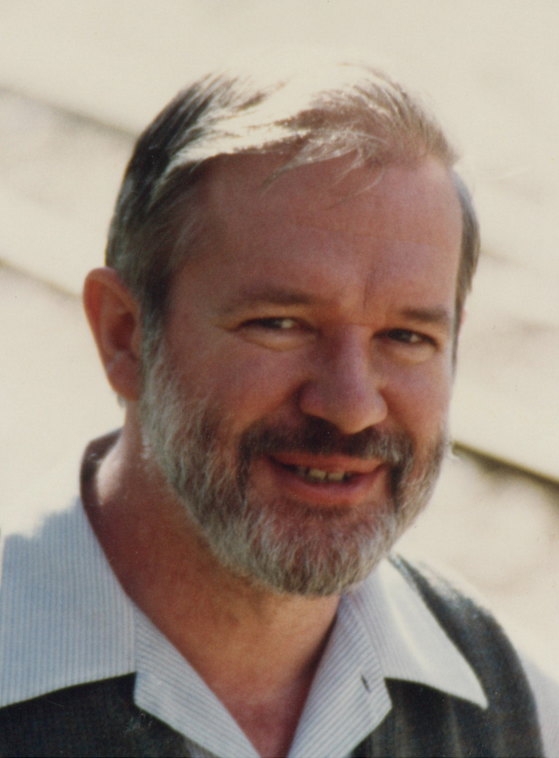
- Allan G. Bromley.
- Born: 1 February 1947; New South Wales, Australia
- Died: 16 August 2002 (aged 55); New South Wales, Australia
- Education: University of Sydney
- Known for: Understanding of Charles Babbage's calculating engines.
- Scientific career
- Fields: History of computing
- Workplaces: University of Sydney; Science Museum, London

Allan George Bromley (1 February 1947 – 16 August 2002) was an Australian historian of computing who became a world authority on many aspects of early computing and was one of the most avid collectors of mechanical calculators.

The work on understanding Charles Babbage's calculating engines is Allan Bromley's greatest legacy. The October–December 2000 issue of the IEEE Annals of the History of Computing was dedicated to him for the quality of his research on this subject. His studies of the Antikythera mechanism, in collaboration with Michael T. Wright, led to the first working model of this ancient analogue computer.

Bromley was an associate professor at the University of Sydney. His main academic interest was the history of computers. He died of Hodgkin's lymphoma.

== Biography ==
Bromley was born on 1 February 1947 and named after his uncle Allan, who was killed in New Guinea during World War II, and his father George, who died on 8 August 1962. Bromley grew up on a 30-acre (12 ha) property at Freeman's Reach, on the Hawkesbury River, in New South Wales, Australia, in an historic home, "Sunny Corner". He completed his secondary education at Richmond High School and in 1964, at the age of 17, his academic ability earned him a scholarship to study science at the University of Sydney. He had been awarded the Nuclear Research Foundation Medal, University of Sydney, Summer Science School, 1963.

Bromley graduated in 1967, with first-class honours in physics, and stayed on for a research degree in astrophysics He was awarded his PhD in 1971. His doctoral work on maser emission from interstellar gas clouds required extensive computation with high-order polynomials, and awakened his interest in computing.

Bromley had an amateur interest in the history of mechanical inventions, and was aware of the ancestral figure of Charles Babbage. No one had ever made a very detailed study of Babbage's papers and, in a surprising career move, Bromley decided to turn historian, and took a year's sabbatical leave in 1979 to work on the Babbage Papers at the Science Museum in London. What he found was overwhelming: notebooks containing over 6,000 pages of Babbage's impenetrable scribblings, 300 machine drawings, and several hundred notations. They were to occupy Bromley for the next several years. His first marriage, to Jann Makepeace, was during this time. Bromley convinced the Science Museum in London that Babbage's Difference Engine No. 2, which had been designed between 1847 and 1849, could be built and, from 1989 to 1991, it was.

After Babbage's engines, Bromley moved on to other historical computing artefacts. He made a ground-breaking study of the Antikythera Mechanism, originally made famous by the Yale historian Derek de Solla Price in the late 1950s. Price had speculated that the mechanism, dating from 50 BC, was an astronomical calculating device. Bromley's background in astrophysics paid dividends, and after several trips to Athens where he obtained radiographs of the inner mechanisms, and with the help of a clockmaker Frank Percival, back in Sydney, they produced a working reconstruction. In November 2000, Bromley was given a Distinguished Service Award and made an Honorary Associate of the Powerhouse Museum, Sydney. He was also President of the Australian Computer Museum Society, 1996 - 1997.

In 1998, after a long spell of illness, he was diagnosed with Hodgkin's lymphoma. He met Anne Mitchell at that time and, on 15 April 2000 they married. He died on 16 August 2002.

== Collections ==
Bromley started collecting mechanical calculators in 1979. A year later he already had sixty pieces. Eventually he was responsible for a collection of old computers which used to be displayed in the rear foyer of the building containing the University of Sydney Computer Science Department. At home, he had a large personal collection of mechanical calculators, slide rules, and the like. He was a generous donor of artefacts to museums in Australia, especially the Powerhouse Museum in Sydney, and the Australian Computer Museum Society Inc.

His collection included some rare pieces. The pride of place was taken by four mechanical anti-aircraft gun predictors developed and built by the British government after World War I. The machines, weighing about half a tonne, marked the height of mechanical computation; they were first used in the Spanish Civil War and extensively during World War II. They performed in real-time and were capable of predicting the firing angle to explode a shell within 10 metres of a plane at anything up to 10,000 metres.

== Charles Babbage's computing engines ==
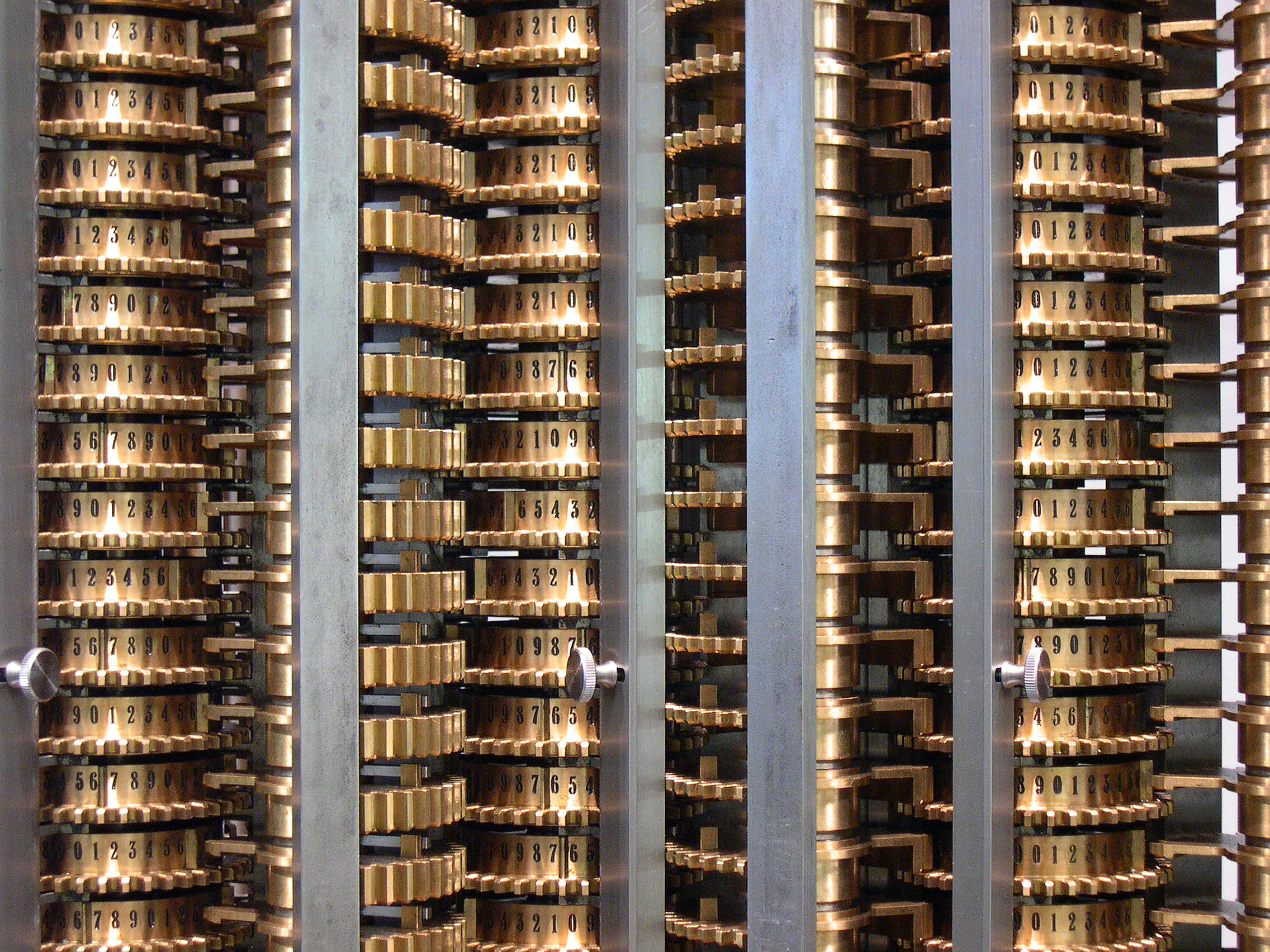
Replica of the Difference Engine in the Science Museum, reconstructed after studies of Charles Babbage's original drawings by Allan Bromley.

Most discussions of the history of computing start with Charles Babbage, and what we know about Charles Babbage's Difference and Analytical engines really starts with the scholarship of Allan Bromley.

— Tim Berguin, Editor-in-chief, IEEE Annals of the History of Computing, Volume 22, number 4, October–December 2000, p.2

Part of Allan Bromley's scholarship was his study, at the Science Museum library in London, of the original drawings for the Difference Engine and Analytical Engine designed by Charles Babbage more than a century earlier. These studies and the most detailed analysis and interpretation led to the reconstruction of two Difference Engines No. 2 under the direction of Doron Swade:

During several visits to London beginning in 1979, Allan G. Bromley of the University of Sydney in Australia examined Babbage's drawings and notebooks in the Science Museum Library and became convinced that Difference Engine No. 2 could be built and would work. I had independently read of Babbage's hapless fate and become deeply puzzled as to why no one had tried to resolve the issue of Babbage's failures by actually building his engine.
In 1985, shortly after my appointment as curator of computing, Bromley appeared at the science museum carrying a two-page proposal to do just that. He suggested that the museum attempt to complete the machine by 1991, the bicentenary of Babbage's birth. Bromley's proposal marked the start of a six years project that became something of a personal crusade for me.

— Doron D. Swade, Scientific American, February 1993, p.89

== Antikythera mechanism ==
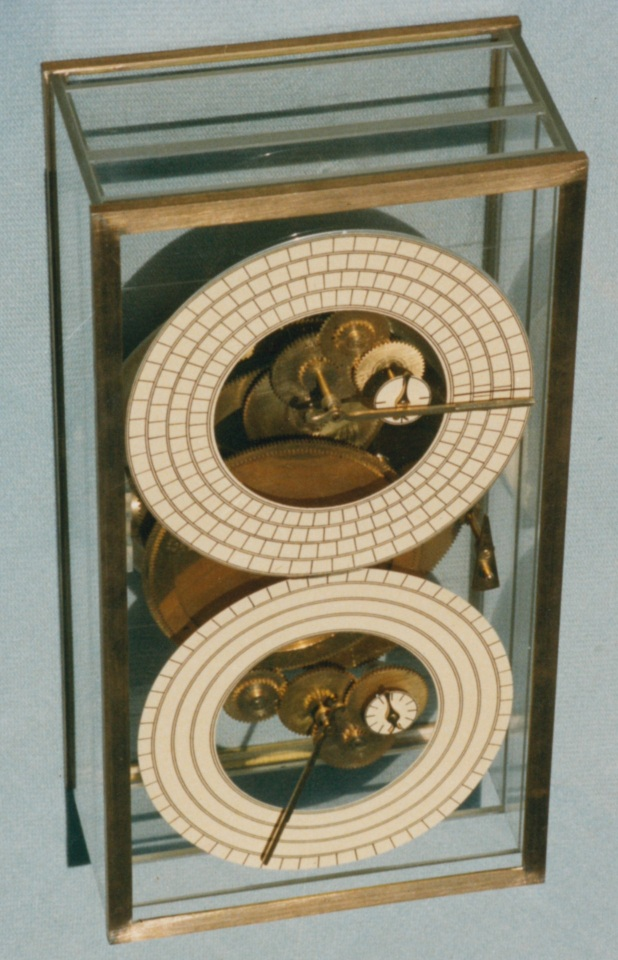
Antikythera mechanism built by Allan Bromley and Frank Percival.

Bromley built a partial reconstruction of the Antikythera mechanism, one of the oldest (surviving) geared mechanisms known. Working with Frank Percival, a Sydney clockmaker, he improved on an earlier reconstruction by Derek J. de Solla Price. Having tested Price's theory using Meccano parts, Bromley found that the mechanism was unworkable. Working with Percival, he improved the device by altering the function of the handle so that one complete rotation would correspond to a single day, which he considered to be the most obvious astronomical unit. Bromley worked with the same set of parts as Price, but suspected that a gap in the mechanism was originally home to several extra gears.

Another breakthrough by Bromley concerned a train of gearing which appeared to have 15 and 63 teeth, for which Price had been unable to discover a purpose. Price considered these numbers to be too difficult to work with, and assumed that they should be corrected to 16 and 64, theorising that it could have operated a four-year cycle on the device. Bromley worked with the original count of 15 and 63 teeth, discovering that the train's cycle was four and a half years; four of such cycles equalled 18 years, a duration equal to the cycle of eclipses. With this gearing, the mechanism worked correctly, with the pointer moving into a new square for each new moon, as the handle is turned, meaning that each square on a dial represented one month. Over 223 months, or 18 years, the complete cycle is shown.

The model was acquired by the Museum of Applied Arts & Sciences in early 2017.

== Sources ==
- McCann, Doug; Thorne, Peter (2000). The last of the first, CSIRAC: Australia's first computer. Victoria, Australia: The University of Melbourne. ISBN 978-0-7340-2024-6.
