= Johann Helfrich von Müller =

German mechanical engineer (1746–1830)

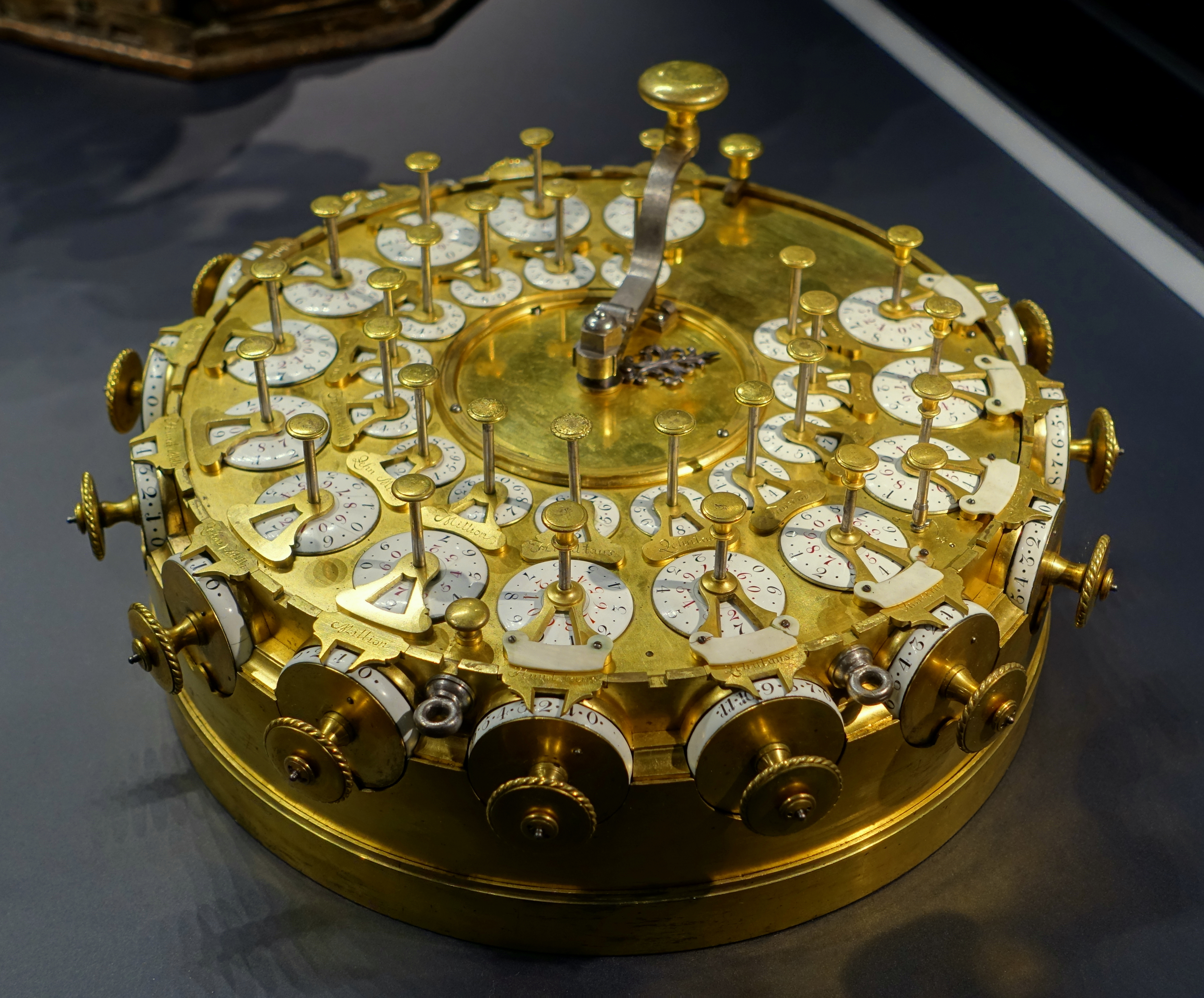
Adding machine by Johann Helfrich von Müller, 1784, in the Hessisches Landesmuseum Darmstadt

Johann Helfrich von Müller (January 16, 1746 in Kleve – 1830) was an engineer in the Hessian army who conceived the difference engine in 1786 (first written reference to the basic principles of a difference machine is dated to 1784), an idea that later evolved into modern computers. In 1784, he was responsible for an improved adding machine based on principles of Leibniz's stepped reckoner.

Müller was demonstrably the first who came up with the idea of calculating mathematical tables automatically by a machine. To achieve this, he planned building a printing differential engine. However, this plan was not realized.
