= Per Georg Scheutz =

Swedish inventor and businessman

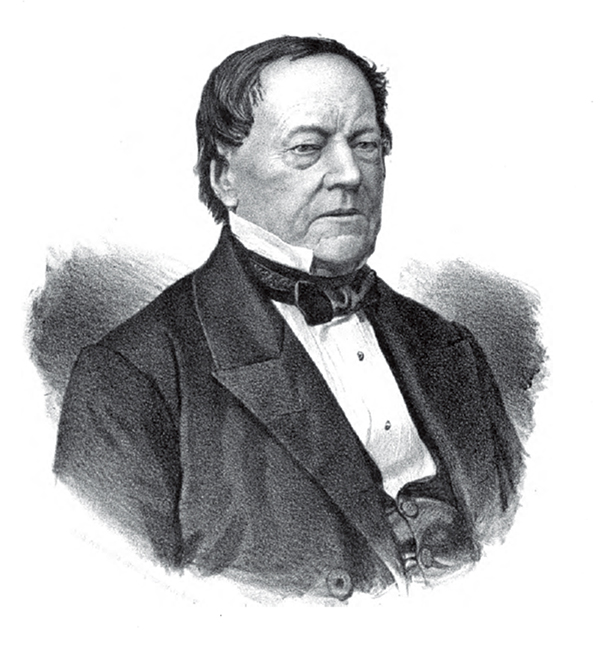
- Portrait of Per Georg Scheutz
- Born: Pehr Georg Scheutz; 23 September 1785
- Died: 22 May 1873 (aged 87)
- Education: Lund University
- Occupations: Lawyer, translator, inventor

Pehr (Per) Georg Scheutz (23 September 1785 – 22 May 1873) was a Swedish lawyer, translator, and inventor, who is now best known for his pioneering work in computer technology.

== Life ==
Scheutz studied law at Lund University, graduating in 1805. He then worked as a legal expert and translator (he translated several works of William Shakespeare and Sir Walter Scott) before turning predominantly to liberal politics and mechanical engineering.

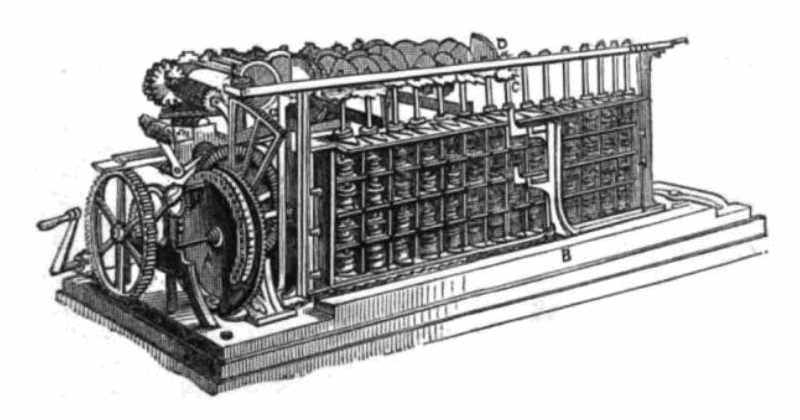
Scheutz's calculator

He is most known for his inventions; the best known of these is the Scheutzian calculation engine, invented in 1837 and finalized in 1843. This machine, which he constructed with his son Edvard Scheutz, was based on Charles Babbage's difference engine. In 1851 they obtained funds from government to build an improved model, which was created in 1853 (was roughly the size of a piano), and subsequently demonstrated at the World's Fair in Paris, 1855. The machine was then sold in 1856 to the Dudley Observatory in Albany, New York. In 1857 British government ordered another model, which was built by Donkin's company in 1859.

The devices were used for creating logarithmic tables.

While the machine was not perfect and could not produce complete tables, Martin Wiberg reworked the construction from the ground up and in 1875 created a compact device which would print complete tables.

Scheutz was elected a member of the Royal Swedish Academy of Sciences in 1856.

== See also ==
- Difference engine
- Martin Wiberg
- Timeline of computing hardware before 1950
