= The Thrilling Adventures of Lovelace and Babbage =

2015 graphic novel written by Sydney Padua

- Dust jacket of US edition
- Author: Sydney Padua
- Illustrator: Sydney Padua
- Language: English
- Subject: Ada Lovelace and Charles Babbage
- Genre: Steampunk
- Publisher: Pantheon Books (US); Penguin Books (UK)
- Publication date: 21 April 2015
- Media type: Print, hardcover
- Pages: 320
- ISBN: 978-0-307-90827-8
- OCLC: 1054115668

The Thrilling Adventures of Lovelace and Babbage: The (Mostly) True Story of the First Computer is a steampunk graphic novel written and drawn by Sydney Padua. It features Ada Lovelace and Charles Babbage in an alternative universe where they have successfully built an analytical engine and use it to "fight crime".

The book was published simultaneously by Pantheon Books in the US and Penguin Books in the UK on 21 April 2015. It has received positive reviews and awards.

== Setting and publication history ==
The book grew out of a webcomic of the same name. The comic began as a single comic strip for Ada Lovelace Day in 2009, a celebration of women in science, technology, engineering and mathematics. Disliking the fact that both Babbage and Lovelace died with their life work incomplete, Padua created a fictional ending for the strip, then found that "a lot of people saw it and thought that I was actually going to do a comic, which I had no intention of doing. But then I started thinking, 'What if I actually did the comic?' I started fooling around, and I guess I'm still fooling around with it."

The setting describes an alternative historical reality in which Ada Lovelace and Charles Babbage have actually built an analytical engine and use it to "fight crime" at Queen Victoria's request. Also featured in the comic is the great engineer Isambard Kingdom Brunel, whom Padua has called "the Wolverine of the early Victorians".

The comic is based on thorough research on the biographies of and correspondence between Babbage and Lovelace, as well as other bits of early Victoriana, which are then twisted for humorous effect. "Some of the documents are more entertaining than the actual comic. Plenty of times, I've thrown something into the comic just so I'd have an excuse to refer to some document," Padua says.

== Awards and reception ==
The book received positive early reviews from Publishers Weekly and Kirkus Reviews.

In December 2015 it was announced that, for The Thrilling Adventures of Lovelace and Babbage, Padua would receive the biennial Neumann Prize of the British Society for the History of Mathematics, which is "awarded for a book in English ... dealing with the history of mathematics and aimed at a broad audience". The UK edition of the book received the 2015 British Book Design and Production Award for graphic novels.

In April 2016 The Thrilling Adventures of Lovelace and Babbage was nominated for the Eisner Award in the Best Graphic Album–New category, and Padua was nominated in the Best Writer/Artist category.

A chamber opera based on the book, with music by Elena Ruehr and libretto by Royce Vavrek, was first performed on 3–5 February 2023, by Guerilla Opera in collaboration with the MIT Center for Art, Science & Technology. The Guerilla Opera production was also presented by the Rozsa Center for the Performing Arts at Michigan Technological University on 12–15 October 2023.
