= Henry Prevost Babbage =

Soldier and computer pioneer

- Born: 1824
- Died: 29 January 1918
- Allegiance: East India Company
- Branch: Bengal Army
- Rank: Major general
- Education: University College School; University College London
- Other work: Babbage's Calculating Engines

Henry Prevost Babbage (1824–1918) was a soldier in the Bengal Army of the East India Company. After retiring with the rank of major general, he continued the work of his father, Charles Babbage, whom he had assisted as a student. He organised and edited his father's papers and prototypes and arranged for their publication and completion. These works included Babbage's Calculating Engines (1889) and a working Analytical Engine Mill – a simplified portion of the full Analytical Engine design.

== Military career ==
He was brevetted as a colonel in the Bengal Staff Corps on 10 June 1874.
