= Christel Hamann =

German-born inventor

Christel Bernhard Julius Hamann (born February 27, 1847, in Hammelwarden, Oldenburg – died June 9, 1948, in Berlin, Germany) was a German-born inventor of calculating machines.

== Early life and education ==
Hamann's father was an Oldenburg border guard and ambassador in Ellwitz. Hamann completed an apprenticeship as a mechanic at the Nautical Institute in Bremerhaven and visited the pilot school there. Afterwards he attended the mathematical-mechanical institute of A. Ott in Kempten (Allgäu) in the workshops of Carl Zeiss in Jena and in the workshop of Carl Bamberg in Berlin.

== Career ==
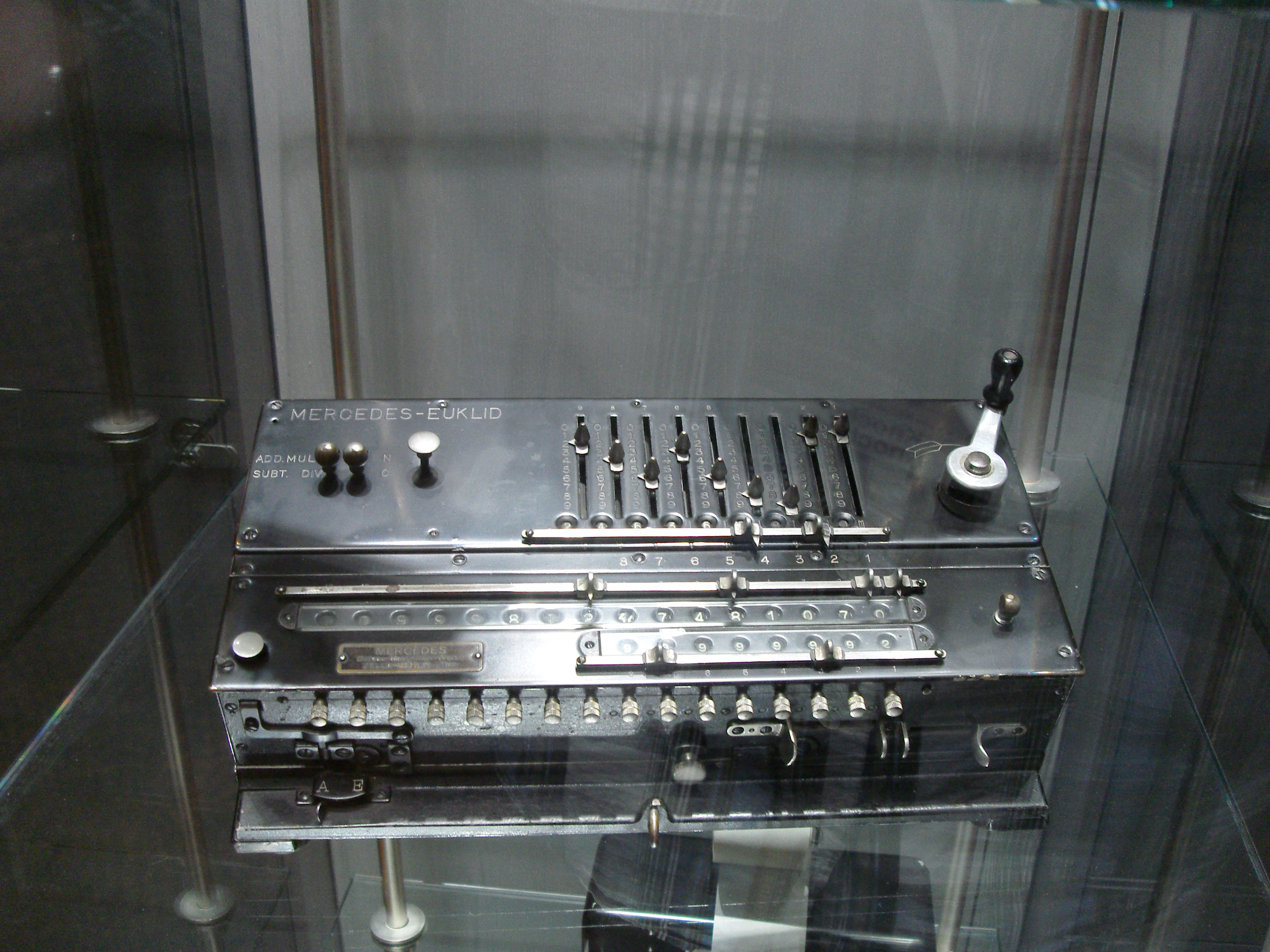
Mercedes-Euklid mechanical calculator

Around 1889 he developed the calculation machines Gauss and Berolina inspired in part by the Gauss computing machine of Gottfried Wilhelm Leibniz and the stepped reckoner drum. In 1896 he founded the Mathematical-Mechanical Institute in Berlin-Friedenau, where he developed and built mathematical instruments and surveying instruments. In 1900, he received the gold medal for his instruments at the World Exposition in Paris.

In 1907, his institute was taken over by Mercedes Büromaschinen in Berlin. There, he designed the Mercedes Euklid computing machine with the Proportional Lever principle developed by Hamann. He also improved machines for accounting.

In 1909 he built a difference engine.

From 1922 he worked for Deutsche Telephonwerke und Kabelindustrie in Berlin (DeTeWe). From 1925 onwards, he developed the shifting system as a propulsion system for computing machines. As chief designer, Christel Hamann and his colleague Heinrich Wilhelm created the essential foundations for the DeTeWe computing machines built as far back as the 1960s, Before the electronics displaced the electromechanics.

In 1933 he became an honorary doctor at the TH Berlin.

He was married to Hedwig Schindler (1872–1949) but had no children.
