= Sydney Padua =

British graphics artist

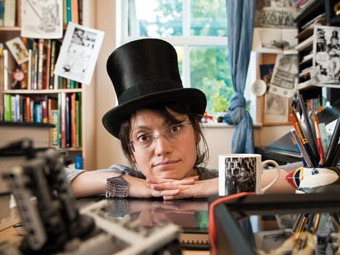
Sydney Padua, 2010

Melina Sydney Padua is a graphic artist and animator based in the United Kingdom. She is the author of The Thrilling Adventures of Lovelace and Babbage steampunk comic, and her animation work appears in several popular Hollywood films.

She has worked as character animator in feature films such as Marmaduke, Clash of the Titans, The Golden Compass, The Chronicles of Narnia: Prince Caspian, The Iron Giant, Quest for Camelot, and The Jungle Book.

Her work has been exhibited at the BBC Tech Lab and at a steampunk exhibition by the Oxford Museum of the History of Science. She gave a conference on storytelling at The Story, an event shared with Cory Doctorow, Tim Etchells, David Hepworth, Aleks Krotoski, and Tony White among others. In December 2015, she was awarded the biennial Neumann Prize of the British Society for the History of Mathematics for The Thrilling Adventures of Lovelace and Babbage. In April 2016, she was nominated for the Eisner Award in the Best Writer/Artist category, and The Thrilling Adventures of Lovelace and Babbage in the Best Graphic Album—New category.

In 2004 Padua decided to teach herself how to animate on a computer. She started by sketching a storyboard for a short film. The end result was the 2.5-minute Agricultural Report. This film ended up being shown at over 200 festivals and won a few awards, including Best Short Film at the Taormina Film Festival and Audience Award for Best First Film at AnimaMundi Brazil.

== Early life ==
Padua grew up in Mexico City and in the Canadian prairie (Western Canada). She now resides in Edinburgh, Scotland, with her husband.

== The Thrilling Adventures of Lovelace and Babbage ==
Sydney Padua wrote the steampunk webcomic 2D Goggles or The Thrilling Adventures of Lovelace and Babbage. It features a pocket universe where Ada Lovelace and Charles Babbage have actually built an analytical engine and use it to "fight crime" at Queen Victoria's request. In April 2015, the comic was published as a 320-page book titled The Thrilling Adventures of Lovelace and Babbage by Penguin Books in the United Kingdom and Pantheon Books in the United States.

The comic is based on thorough research on the biographies of and correspondence between Babbage and Lovelace, as well as other bits of early Victoriana, which is then twisted for humorous effect. It began as a one-shot for Ada Lovelace Day, a celebration of women in science, technology, engineering and mathematics.

The comic was the source of a limited edition print of 25 to raise money for The Ada Initiative in July 2011.

Episodes are also available as an iPhone app.

The comic was adapted as a stage show, A Note of Dischord, by Theatre Paradok at the 2013 Edinburgh Fringe Festival and as an opera by Guerilla Opera in 2023.
