= Martin Wiberg =

Swedish computer pioneer and inventor

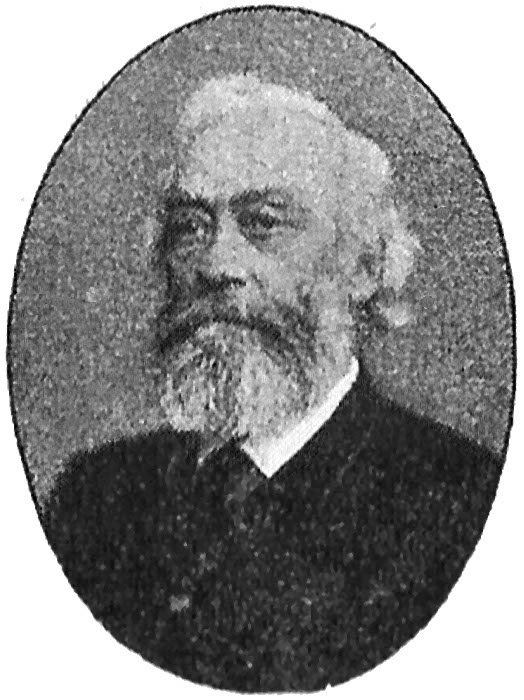
- Born: 4 September 1826; Viby, Kristianstad, Scania, Sweden
- Died: 29 December 1905 (aged 79)
- Occupation: Inventor

Martin Wiberg (4 September 1826 – 29 December 1905) was a Swedish inventor. He enrolled at Lund University in 1845 and became a Doctor of Philosophy in 1850.

Martin Wiberg with his difference engine

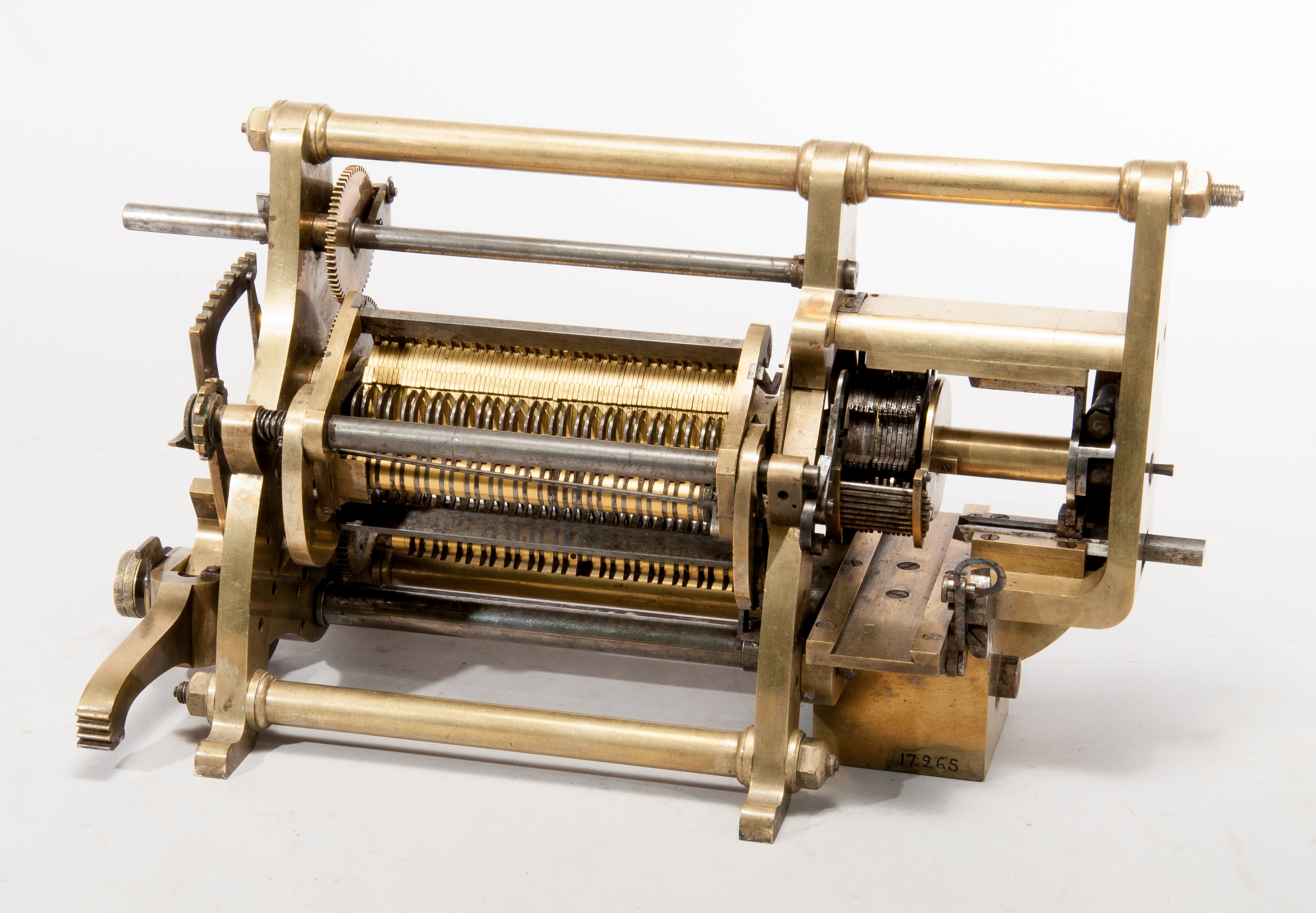
The difference engine invented by Martin Wiberg

He is known as a computer pioneer for his c. 1859 (1857–1860) invention of a machine the size of a sewing machine that could print logarithmic tables (first interest tables appeared in 1860, logarithmic in 1875). The logarithmic tables were subsequently published in English, French and German in 1876. The device was investigated by the French academy of science which also wrote an extensive report on it in 1863. The device was inspired by the similar work done by Per Georg Scheutz (had the same capacity: 15-digit numbers and fourth-order differences) and has similarities with Charles Babbage's difference engine. (Scheutz machine was based on the difference engine). The device is preserved at Tekniska museet (The Technical Museum) of Sweden in Stockholm. Wiberg failed to sell his machine, and also failed to sell the output tables due to their bad looks.

Apart from this invention, Wiberg invented numerous other devices and gadgets, among these a cream separator and a pulse jet engine. None of these were commercially successful.

== See also ==
- Difference engine
- Per Georg Scheutz
