= Australian Computer Museum Society =

Australian Computer Museum Society Inc
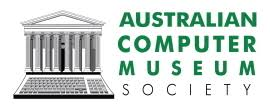
- Established: 1994
- Location: Croydon, New South Wales, Australia
- Type: Computer museum
- Visitors: 500+ (2025)
- President: Adrian Franulovich
- Website: www.acms.org.au

The Australian Computer Museum Society Inc, (ACMS) is a society dedicated to the preservation of the history of computing in Australia, including software, hardware, operating systems and literature. ACMS was registered and is a charitable institution which relies on memberships and donations to operate. Established in 1994, their members have since amassed a large number of unique devices designed and built by Australians.
