= Flong =

Temporary negative paper mould made from an impression

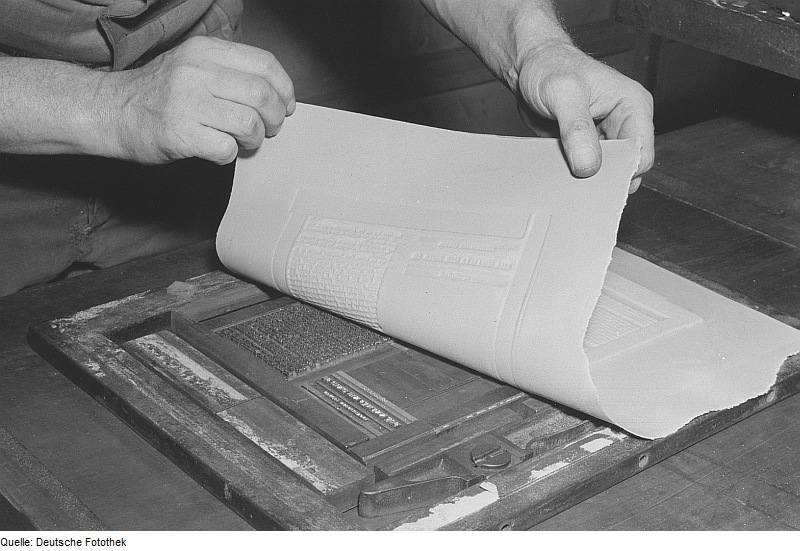
A flong being made, Leipzig, Germany, 1953

In relief printing, a flong, also called a matrix or mat, is a flat material made of paper and paste or wood pulp and filler that can be formed into a mold by pressing it onto a forme of set type or other relief matter, such as printing blocks. When heated to dry or after pressing, the flong is removed, and the resulting mold is used to cast a flat or curved metal stereotype (or "stereo") that can be used in letterpress printing on either flat-bed or rotary press. After the flong is made, the original type can be distributed (for hand-set composition) or melted down (for hot metal typesetting).

The term flong was introduced by 1862 to refer specifically to a paper-based matrix, which was in use no later than the 1850s. The word derives from the French flan, which then referred generically to a cake-like pastry, and was coined by stereotypers who saw a resemblance between the layered paper-and-paste mold material and the food.

Flongs were a component of the expansion of newspaper publishing from the mid-19th century onward, enabling the use of high-speed rotary presses that required curved stereotype plates rather than flat formes of individual type. The scale of newspaper production from the mid-19th century through the late 20th century required substantial quantities of flongs, based on the number of newspapers in operation and their page counts: each page of each edition of every newspaper required a separate flong and one or more matching stereotypes.

Newspaper flongs were typically discarded after casting, and the resulting stereotype plates were melted down after printing. However, some printers kept them on hand during this era for reprinting: one source claims the United States Government Publishing Office had over a quarter of a million flongs in storage by 1941.

== History ==
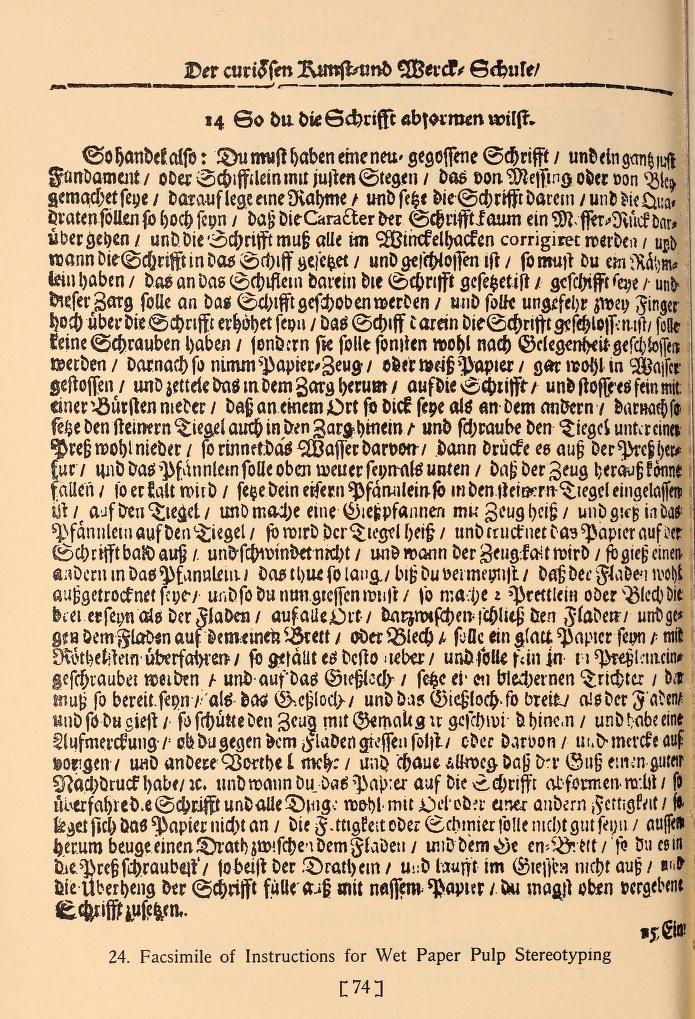
Figure 24 from Kubler's A New History of Stereotyping (1941), reproducing a page from Der curiosen Kunst- und Werck-Schule (1696) describing a paper-based type molding process.

The idea of creating molds from set type predates paper-based flongs by centuries. Various methods using clay, plaster of paris, and other materials were tried from at least the early 18th century, though some may date earlier. A description of a paper-based molding process appeared in the German craft manual Der curiosen Kunst- und Werck-Schule (first edition 1696; expanded 1705), attributed to Johann Kunckel von Löwenstern. In it, the author describes pressing wet paper stock onto oiled type, drying the mold with heated metal, and casting from the result. The author refers to the paper mold as a Fladen (a flat cake or pancake).

William Ged of Scotland experimented with plaster-mold stereotyping in the 1720s and 1730s, but, in a book published by a colleague and Ged's children, it is claimed that he was sabotaged by compositors and pressmen who feared the technology would displace their labor. Charles Stanhope, 3rd Earl Stanhope invested in perfecting a plaster process around 1805 (first developed in the 1780s), and his stereotyping operation produced good results. The time required to produce the molds and plates limited its use to books printed repeatedly, such as Bibles. The French printer Jean Baptiste Genoux is generally credited with inventing the wet paper-based process, receiving a patent in 1829. However, it took until the 1850s and 1860s for the method to become reliable enough for newspaper use. The Times of London adopted it around 1863.

The wet flong method, which required layers of tissue and blotter paper saturated with paste to be beaten into the type form with a stiff brush, heated, and dried before removal, was supplanted in the 1890s by dry flong material. Dry flong was a factory-produced, spongy wood-pulp sheet that needed only dampening and pressure, dramatically speeding production from tens of minutes to a few minutes. Arthur Winter's Stereotyping and Electrotyping (1948) attributed the simultaneous invention of dry flong to individuals in Germany and England in 1893. By the early 20th century, dry flong had become the dominant method in newspaper stereotyping worldwide.

One of the two primary American manufacturers of flong was the Wood Flong Corporation, founded by brothers Benjamin and Henry Wood in the 1910s, based in Hoosick Falls, New York. The company operated until the 1980s and was at one point owned by the early internet technology firm Bolt Beranek and Newman (BBN). Its main competitor, the Certified Dry Mat Corporation, was founded in 1924, and run by George A. Kubler, who also self-published a number of books through the corporation on the stereotype process and printing history.

The flong/stereotype process remained essential to newspaper production until the shift from letterpress to offset lithography, which occurred at most U.S. newspapers between the 1960s and 1980s. Some newspapers in other countries continued to use the process into the 1990s and possibly later.

== Prior methods of creating stereotype molds ==
Several methods of creating molds for casting stereotype plates preceded the paper-based flong:

=== Clay ===
A French printer, Gabriel Valleyre, in 1730 pressed the set-up forme in clay or a similar material to make a reverse image, and then poured molten copper into the mould. His copies were not very good, due either to the clay he was using, or the softness of the copper. However, the method was later revived, improved, and used by the Government Printing Office in Washington. Hoe & Company included a range of equipment for use with the process in their 1881 catalogue.

=== Plaster of paris ===
The plaster process can reproduce finer lines than the paper process, but has the disadvantage that the mould is broken to remove the stereo. This was the process developed by William Ged in the 1720s, where a plaster mould is made of the set-up type. The process was perfected around 1805 under the patronage of Lord Stanhope. He then established and funded a stereotyping plant in London. But because it was expensive, and there were relatively few books that needed repeated print-runs other than bibles or schoolbooks, the process did not come into widespread use for another two decades. Stanhope's plant was commercially unsuccessful. The Bank of England printed its notes using stereos from plaster moulds in 1816.

== Flong types ==
=== Wet flong ===
Paper-based wet flong is also called the papier mâché method, though the term is not precisely accurate. (Note: George Dodd wrote in 1853 that "there is a method of making stereotypes from paper, or rather papier-mâché," but the process as practiced used layers of tissue and blotter paper interleaved with paste, not macerated paper pulp. See: Dodd, George (1853). Curiosities of Industry, Printing: Its Modern Varieties. London: George Routledge and Co. p. 11.) The French printer Jean Baptiste Genoux is generally credited with inventing the paper-based process and he was granted a French patent for it in 1829. However, a paper-based molding process was described as early as 1696 in the German craft manual Der curiosen Kunst- und Werck-Schule.

In the wet process, a number of layers of sheets of tissue and blotter paper are interleaved with a paste of flour, water, alum, and other ingredients. The paste could be to the stereotyper's own recipe or a proprietary paste. The flong was beaten into the type form with a stiff-bristled brush, with many gentle blows preferred over fewer strong ones. Any hollows in the back of the flong after it was beaten in were filled, either with strawboard or pieces of flong or with a packing compound. The flong was then covered with a sheet of backing paper and moved, still sitting on the forme, to a steam drying table. Here it was covered with four to eight pieces of soft blanket and pressed down to ensure that the flong stayed in contact with the forme while it dried. Drying took six to seven minutes typically, but this depended on the steam pressure.

=== Dry flong ===
Unlike the wet method, dry flong did not require layers of paste, heating, or extended drying. Instead, a factory-produced sheet of spongy material, typically made from wood pulp or a mixture of rag and chemical pulp, was kept damp in a humidor and then placed under pressure in contact with the type form. The pressures needed are quite high and effectively require a hydraulic press. It appears to have been first invented in 1893 by George Eastwood in England, but versions were also produced in Germany in 1894 and in the United States in 1900. Dry flong took several years to catch on in newspapers despite its advantages, because it required new suppliers and new expertise. Once established, however, it displaced the wet process entirely for newspaper work. By 1946, the dry mat process had completely taken over in newspaper publishing in the United States.

== Uses ==
=== Newspaper production ===
The primary use of flongs was in newspaper stereotyping, where they enabled the casting of curved plates for high-speed rotary presses. A newspaper's composing room would lock up each page as a flat forme, from which a flong would be made and sent to the stereotype department. The flong was placed in a curved casting box, and molten type metal poured in to create a semicylindrical plate that could be clamped onto the press cylinder. Ben Dalgin, the New York Times production manager, wrote in 1946 that the newspaper cast 90,000 pounds of type metal nightly for daily editions and 300,000 pounds every Saturday night for the Sunday paper, all of it melted down after use.

Dalgin stated that as many as thirty, and maybe more, plates had been cast from a single flong. However, flongs typically could not be removed from the casting box and reused for a separate casting session. George Kubler noted in 1941 that the United States Government Publishing Office in Washington had over a quarter of a million flongs in "Mat Only" storage, "the mats being stored for future use and the type destroyed."

=== Advertising and syndication ===
National advertisers, movie studios, and other businesses distributed flongs of their advertisements to newspapers, sometimes with a section cut out for the local store or theater name to be inserted. Cartoon syndicates distributed comic strips as flongs, with sheets containing six weekday strips and separate color plates for Sunday editions. Clip-art services also sent monthly packages of generic illustrations and decorative elements in flong form.

=== Book and job printing ===
Stereotypes made from flongs were used by book publishers to preserve typeset pages without tying up standing type. Flat plates cast from flongs could be stored compactly and used for reprints. Harper & Brothers, for example, maintained underground vaults of electrotyped and stereotyped plates representing every page of every book the firm published, starting in the early 1850s.

== Casting ==
The golden rule for stereotyping was to have cool metal and a hot box to avoid problems with shrinkage cavities on the face of the plate or sinks, where the face of the plate shrank away from the front. Sometimes a casting board was used to slow the cooling at the back of the casting, as this could help to avoid problems due to the flong being a poor conductor. Before casting, the casting box was heated. This could be done by ladling hot type metal into it as many as three times and removing the resulting plate. Alternatively, the mould could be gas-heated.

The dry flong was then trimmed, leaving just enough of a margin to go under the gauges in the casting box. These gauges were the pieces of metal, typically an L-shaped piece and a straight piece to border the sides and bottom of the flong in the casting box. The flong was then placed in the casting box and the gauges placed at its sides. The box was closed up, with scrap paper used to form an apron to help funnel the molten type metal into the box.

The type metal mixture used for stereotype plates had from five to ten percent of tin and fifteen percent of antimony, with the balance in lead. The percentage of tin varies with the type of mould as tin makes the cast sharper. Five percent was fine for text letterpress, but ten percent was needed for half-tone blocks.

The following illustrations from Stereotyping and Electrotyping (1880) by Frederick J. Wilson show some of the steps in the process of making and using a flong.

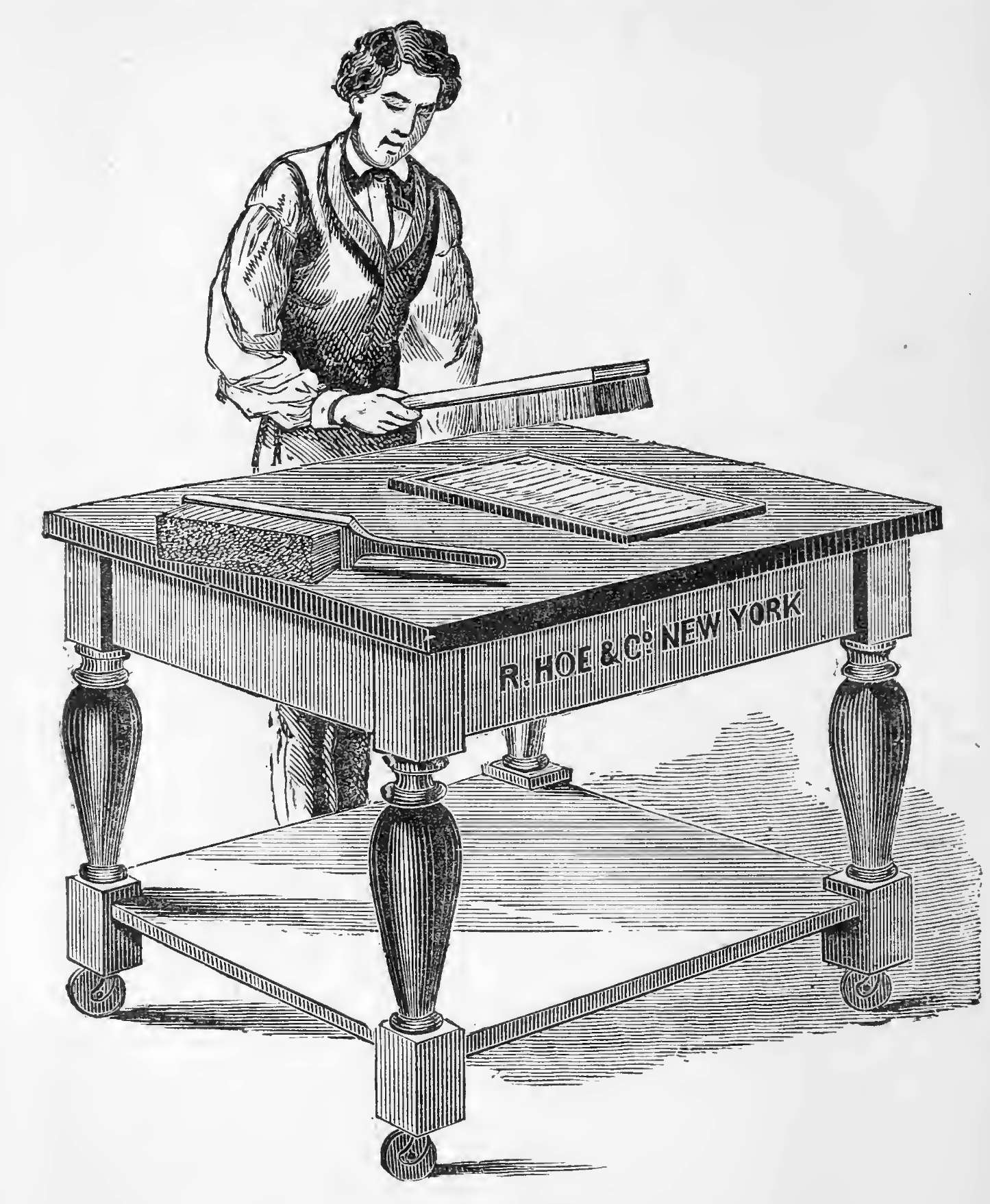
Beating a papier-mâché flong into a forme.

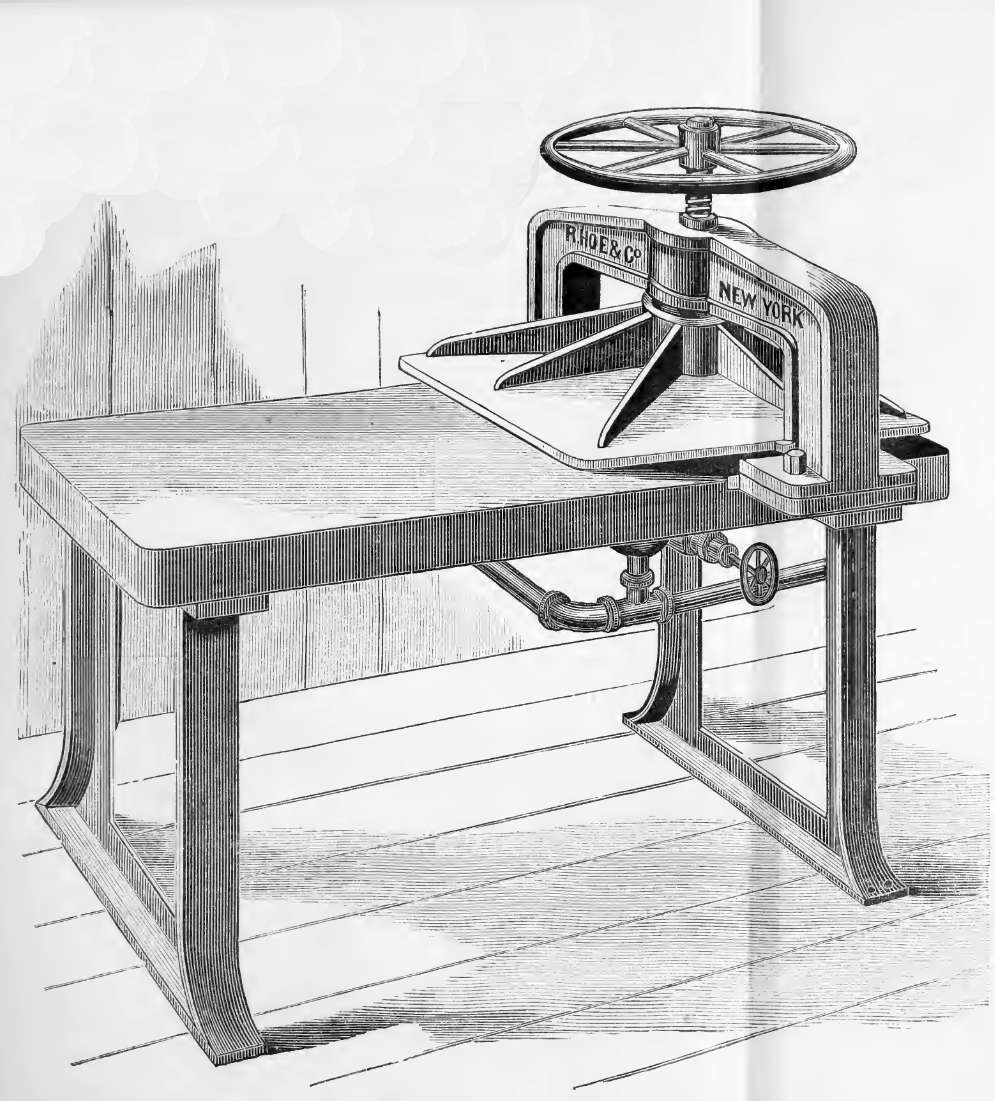
A steam drying table for the flong and forme.

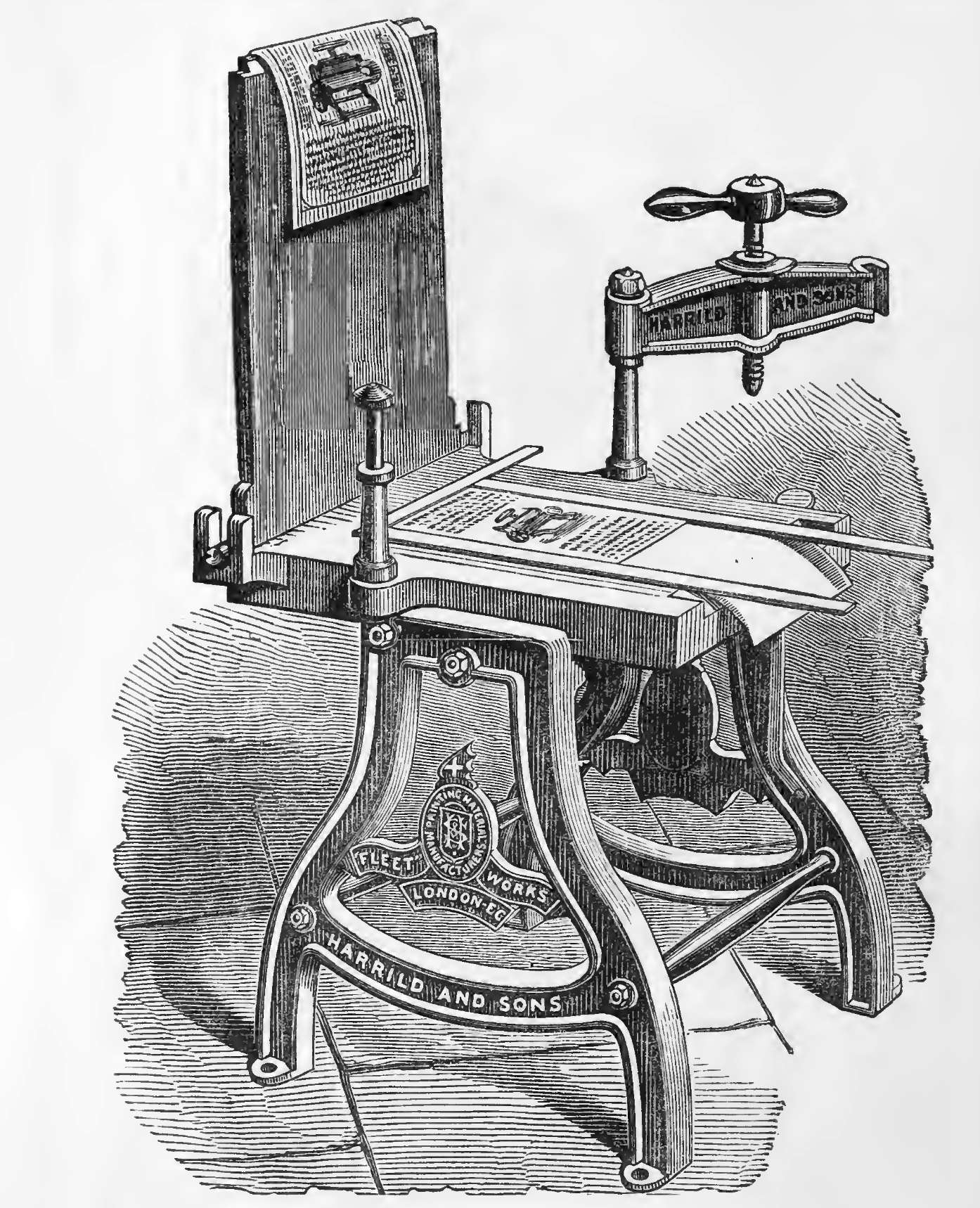
Placing the dry flong in the casting box.

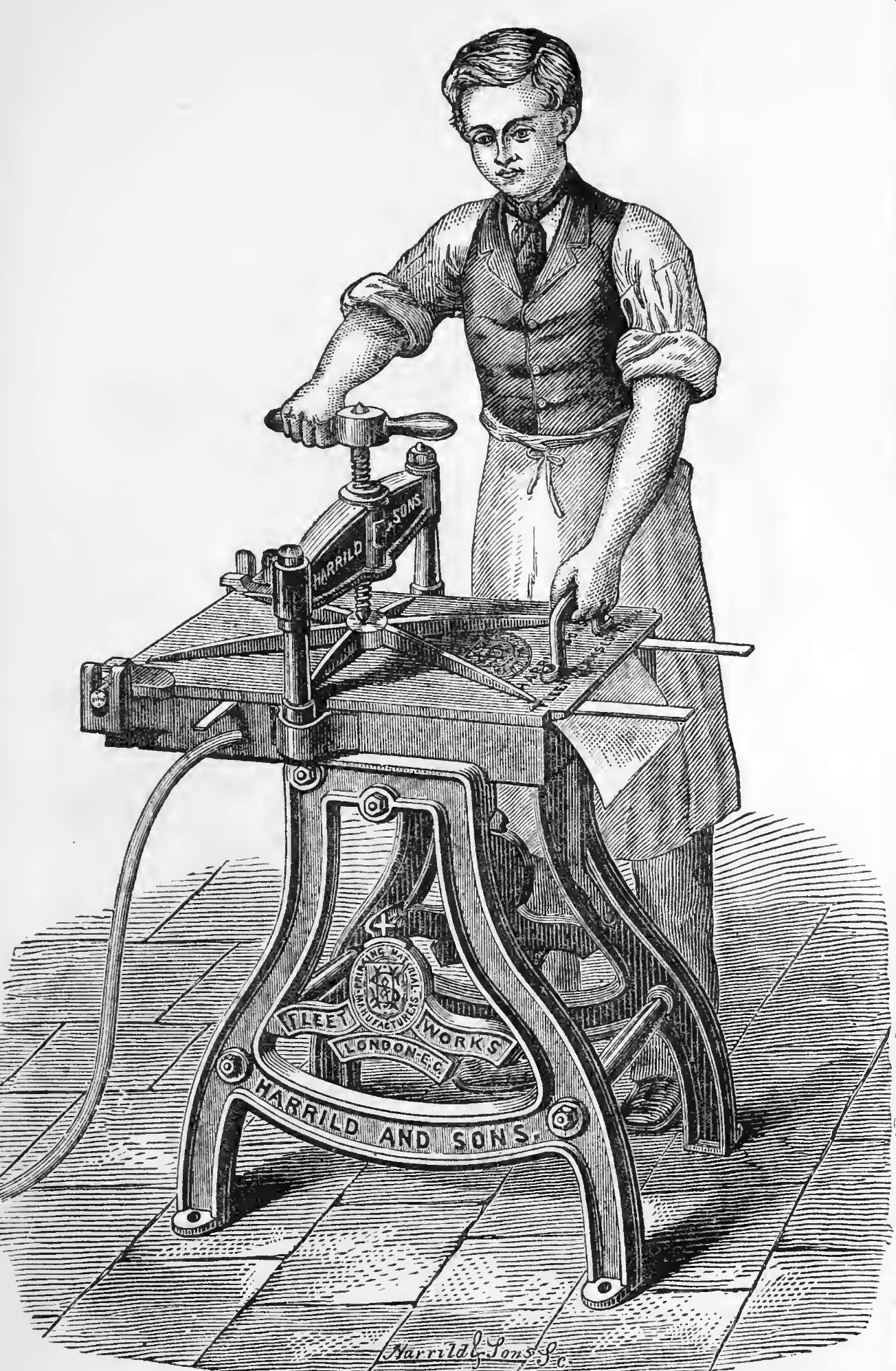
Closing up the casting box.

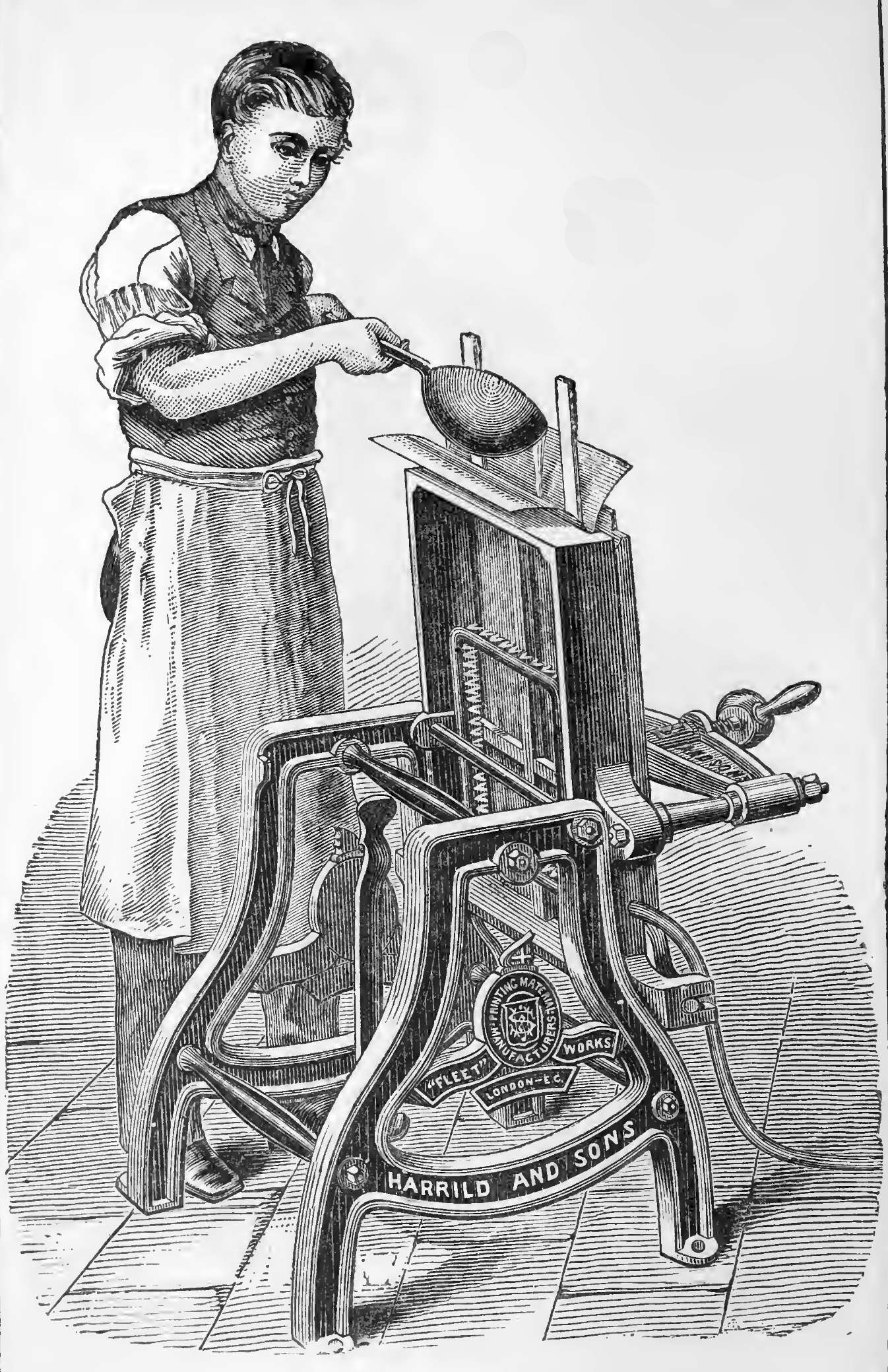
Pouring molten type metal into the casting box.

== Etymology ==
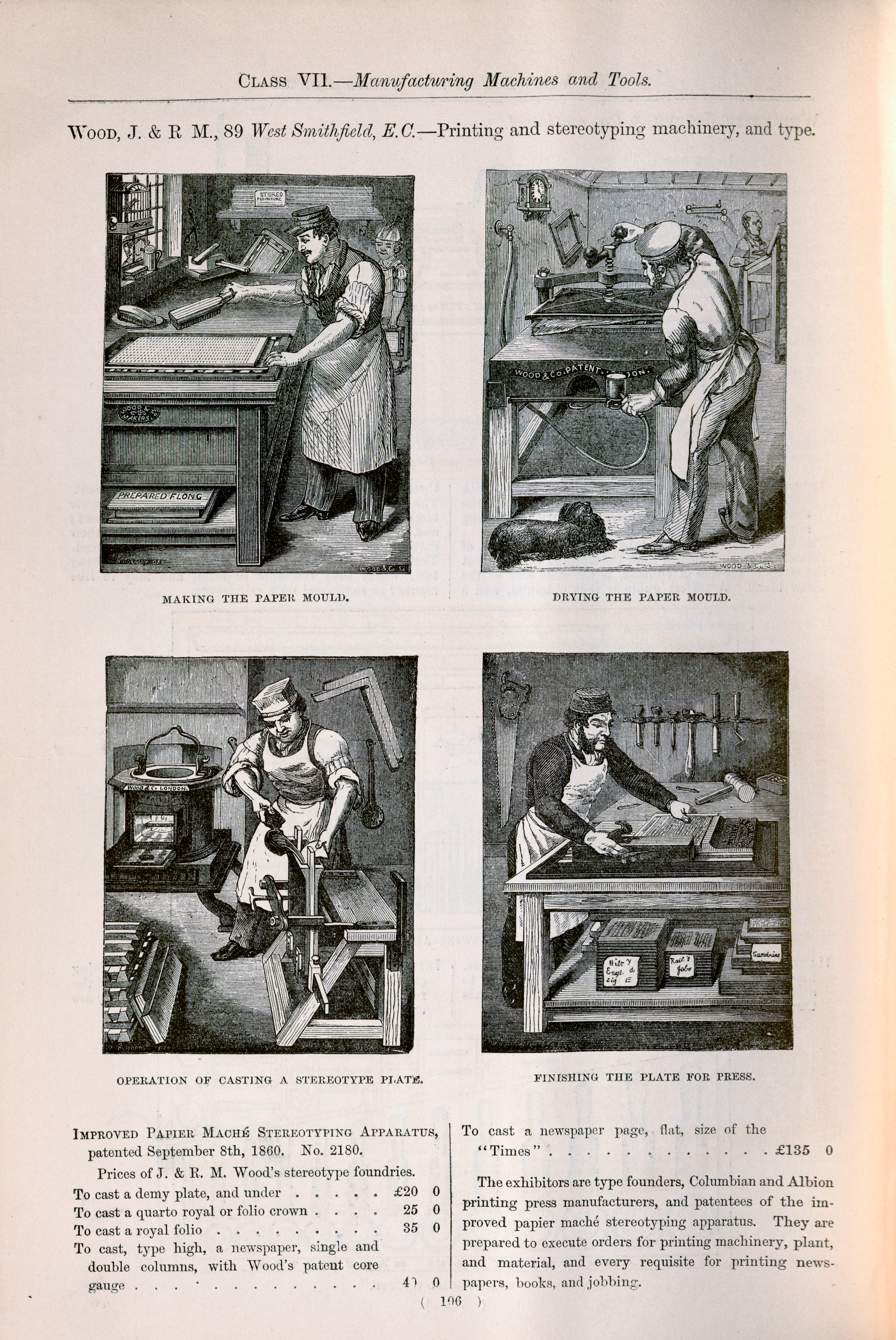
Plate from J. & R. M. Wood of 89 West Smithfield, London, in the 1862 International Exhibition catalogue—the earliest known printed use of the term flong.

Wilson and Southward wrote in their 1880 edition of Stereotyping and Electrotyping that the word flong is an English phonetic form of the French word flan, which is pronounced similarly. They attributed the coinage to the firm of Dellagana & Company, founded by Swiss-Italian brothers Bartolomeo (1833–1882) and Giacomo (1828–1887) Dellagana, apparently the earliest stereotyping company in England. According to Wilson and Southward, when living in Paris, the principal Dellagana brother frequented a café where he partook of a pastry called a flan, "an edible much like in appearance the oat-cake of our northern counties, but thicker, and made in layers, in a similar way to the 'flong.'"

The French word flan in this period referred to an open flat pastry or tart, not the custard dessert (crème caramel) with which it is now commonly associated. The word derives from Old French flaon, from Late Latin fladō ("flat cake"), from a Frankish root meaning "flat" or "broad." When the method was brought to England, the French pronunciation was anglicized to "flong."

The pastry metaphor for the paper mold may predate the Dellagana brothers. The 1696 German craft manual Der curiosen Kunst- und Werck-Schule refers to the paper mold as a Fladen, the Germanic cognate of flan, suggesting that the resemblance between a flat, layered paper mold and a flat cake was independently obvious to practitioners.

A similar term, flanc, was used in Joseph Martin Kronheim's British patent of 1844 for a paste-only process, somewhere between plaster and flong, which he said in a letter of 1883 that he had first observed in Brussels. Kronheim said in the letter that he sold the patent to a firm that went bankrupt, so flanc never caught on.

The term flong was used primarily in British and American printing. In other countries, the mold was more commonly referred to simply as a wet mat or dry mat. In American usage, mat (short for matrix) was often preferred, particularly by later generations of printers who may never have heard the word flong in daily use, even though it appeared on the products of manufacturers like the Wood Flong Corporation.

== Surviving examples ==
Relatively few flongs or stereotypes survive compared to the number that were created. Flongs were destroyed in the process of casting or subsequently discarded, and stereotypes were melted down after printing. However, advertising, comics, and full-page newspaper flongs regularly appear in small numbers at online auction sites. These are typically flongs that were made and not put into production due to some flaw or timing, which explains their clean condition.

More advertising and clip-art flongs survived than newspaper pages, because they were produced in large quantities and only a portion was ever made into plates. The Billy Ireland Cartoon Library & Museum at Ohio State University in Columbus, Ohio, holds a significant collection of individual and newspaper-page comics flongs and stereotypes, including what printing historian Glenn Fleishman has described as the only known surviving semi-cylindrical comics page printing plate.

Flongs have also been found in unexpected contexts. At least two houses in the United States have been discovered with flong used as insulation, its thick wood-pulp composition making it a serviceable building material. A book from 1904, Fairy Tales Up To Now, was bound in dry flong. The design journal PM (Production Manager) used a flong as its cover for a 1935 issue. The artists Asger Jorn and Guy Debord bound their work Fin de Copenhague (1957) in flong in an edition of 200. In 1990, the typographic journal U&lc, published by the International Typeface Corporation, was issued in a flong slipcase for volume 17, number 3, produced for the Type 90 conference in Oxford, England.

== In popular culture ==
On 1 April 1977, The Guardian published a seven-page spoof supplement on San Serriffe, a fictional island nation whose place names were typographical puns. The indigenous inhabitants were said to be the Flong and their language was Ki-flong. The hoax, ranked fifth among the top one hundred April Fools' Day hoaxes by the Museum of Hoaxes, is described in detail in the article on San Serriffe.
