= Friden =

Friden may refer to:

== People ==
- Anders Fridén (born 1973), Swedish vocalist and songwriter
- Carl Friden (1891–1945), Swedish-born, American mechanical engineer and businessman
- Yue Xia Wang Fridén (born 1962), Swedish-Chinese table tennis player

== Other uses ==
- Friden, Inc., an American company
- Friden, Derbyshire, a village in England
