= FACOM =

Fujitsu computer brand

FACOM logo

FACOM (Fujitsu Automatic COMputer) is a trademark used for Fujitsu's computers. The first product is FACOM 100, built in 1954. In May 1990, the brand name of FACOM was abolished and changed to Fujitsu.

FACOM numbering roughly follows the following scheme, but the numbering of some early relay computers is irregular:

- 100s: relay computers
- 200/210: parametron computers
- 220 and above: electronic computers (transistors, integrated circuits)

== Products ==
=== Relay computers ===
Relay computers or electromechanical computers include:

- FACOM 100, electromechanical computer built by Fujitsu in 1954
- FACOM 128, relay-based electromechanical computer built by Fujitsu in the late 1950s. Certified to Mechanical Engineering Heritage (Japan) No. 129, in 2025.
- FACOM 138A

Irregularly numbered relay computers include: FACOM 318A, FACOM 415A, FACOM 416A, FACOM 426A, FACOM 426B, FACOM 514A, FACOM 524A

=== Parametron computers ===
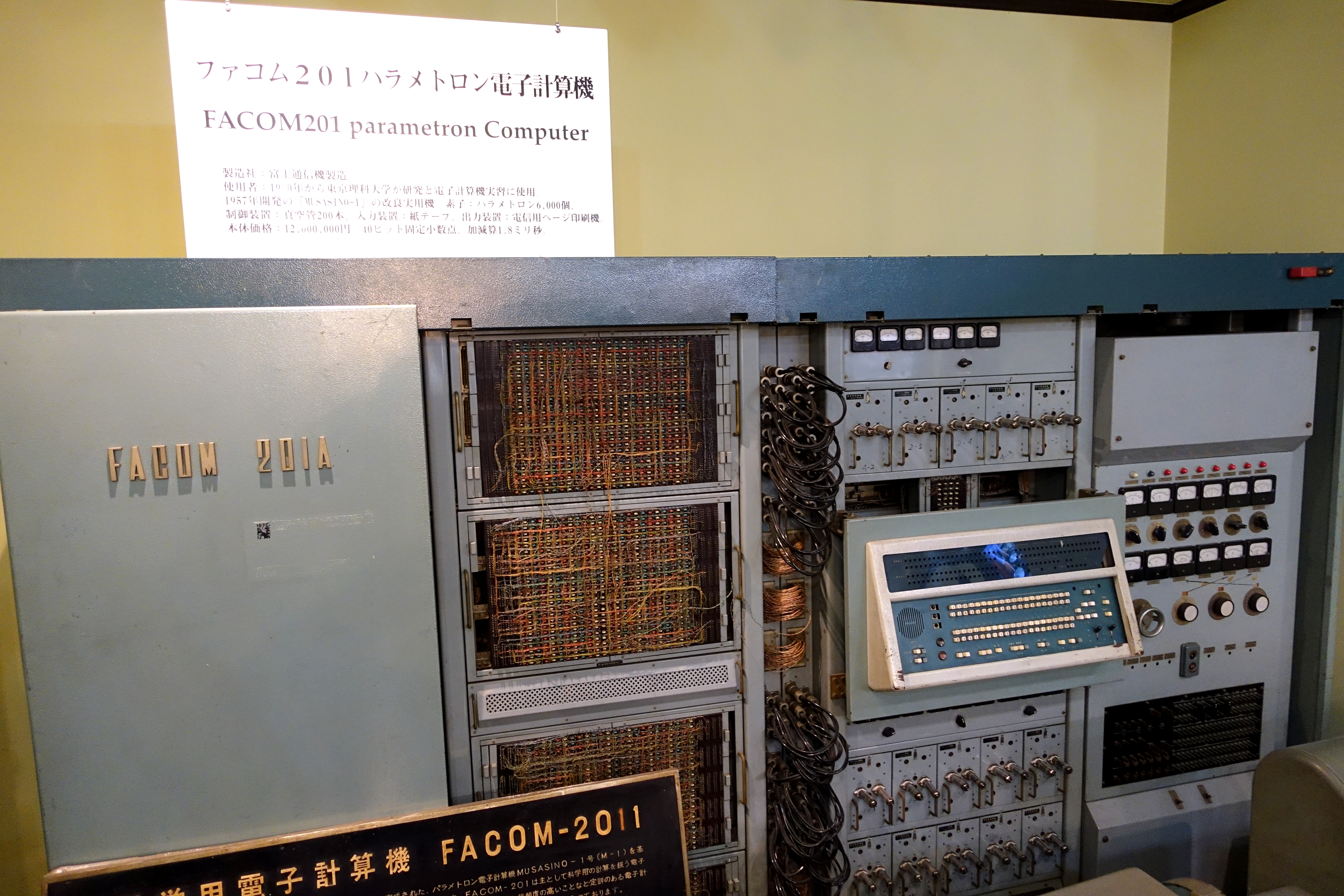
FACOM 201 Parametron Computer

- FACOM 200
- FACOM 201
- FACOM 202
- FACOM 212 shipped in 1959

=== Transistor computers ===
- Early transistor computers:
  - FACOM 222
  - FACOM 231
- FACOM 230 series:
  - FACOM 230 / FACOM 230-30
  - FONTAC / FACOM 230-50
  - FACOM 230-10
  - FACOM 230-60 (1968)
  - FACOM 230-5 series
    - FACOM 230-25, FACOM 230-35, FACOM 230-45 (1968)
    - FACOM 230-45S, FACOM 230-55 (1974)
    - FACOM 230-75
    - FACOM 230-75 APU (1977) - A computer for scientific and technological calculations with enhanced computing power by adding a pipeline system "array processor" (vector processor) to FACOM 230-75. FACOM 230-75 APU achieved 22M FLOPS. It was delivered to the National Aerospace Laboratory of Japan (JAXA). It's only one year behind the Cray-1. This machine will lead to the later VP series.
- FACOM 270 series:
- FACOM M series: IBM System/360, System/370 compatible
  - FACOM M-190 (1974): This is a super-large machine that uses LSI, and has two to three times the performance of IBM System/370. The fastest computer in the world at this time.
  - FACOM M-200 (1978): The fastest computer in the world at this time.
  - FACOM M-130F, M-140F, M-150F, M-160F, M-170F (1979): Supports Japanese language. Includes software supporting Japanese, a device for inputting Japanese, and a Kanji dot impact printer.
  - FACOM M-380, M-382 (1981): Supports 31-bit address space (2GB). A super-large machine that uses ECL / TTL LSI.
  - FACOM M-780 (1985): A super-large machine that uses an ECL LSI with 10,000 gates / chip. Maximum physical memory 256 Mbytes, maximum 64 channels. Water cooling.

=== FACOM VP series (supercomputers) ===
Supercomputers include:

- FACOM VP-100, VP-200 (1982): VP-200 achieved up to 500 MFLOPS
- FACOM VP-400 (1985): Beyond 1 GFLOPS for the first time in the world
- FACOM VP2000 family (1988): The VP2600 measured processing performance exceeding 5GFLOPS and set a world record in 1990.

=== FACOM A series (superminicomputers) ===
Superminicomputers include:

- A-30, A-50, A-70
- A-300, A-400, A-500, A-600

=== FACOM α (Alpha) ===
- FACOM α (Alpha): A Lisp machine. Only about 30 were sold with no successor system.

=== FACOM V series ===
Office computers.

=== FACOM K series ===
Office computers.

=== FACOM G series ===
Workstations include:

- FACOM G-140, G-150, G-150A (1987)
- FACOM G-250, G-250C (1988)

=== Personal computer ===
Personal computers include:

- FACOM 9450 (1981): Fujitsu's branding for the Panafacom C-180

== See also ==
- Facom, a French tool company
