= Stan Frankel =

American computer scientist

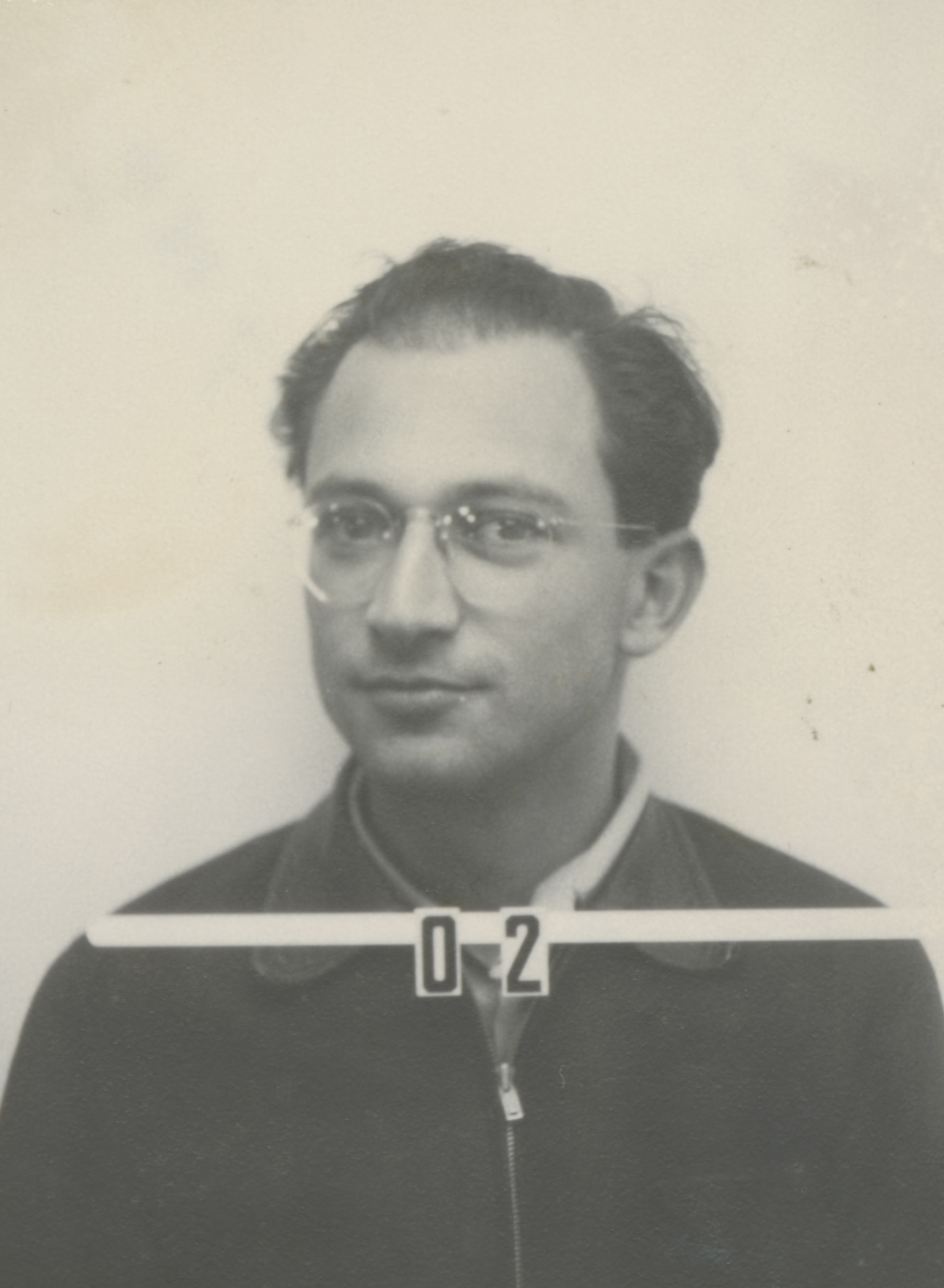
Stan Frankel at Los Alamos in 1943

Stanley Phillips Frankel (1919 – May 1978) was an American computer scientist. He worked in the Manhattan Project and developed various computers as a consultant.

== Early life ==
He was born in Los Angeles, attended graduate school at the University of Rochester, received his PhD in physics from the University of California, Berkeley, and began his career as a post-doctoral student under J. Robert Oppenheimer at University of California, Berkeley in 1942.

== Career ==
Frankel helped develop computational techniques used in the nuclear research taking place at the time, notably making some of the early calculations relating to the diffusion of neutrons in a critical assembly of uranium with Eldred Nelson. He joined the T (Theoretical) Division of the Manhattan Project at Los Alamos in 1943. His wife Mary Frankel was also hired to work as a human computer in the T Division. While at Los Alamos, Frankel and Nelson organized a group of scientists' wives, including Mary, to perform some of the repetitive calculations using Marchant and Friden desk calculators to divide the massive calculations required for the project. This became Group T-5 under New York University mathematician Donald Flanders when he arrived in the late summer of 1943.

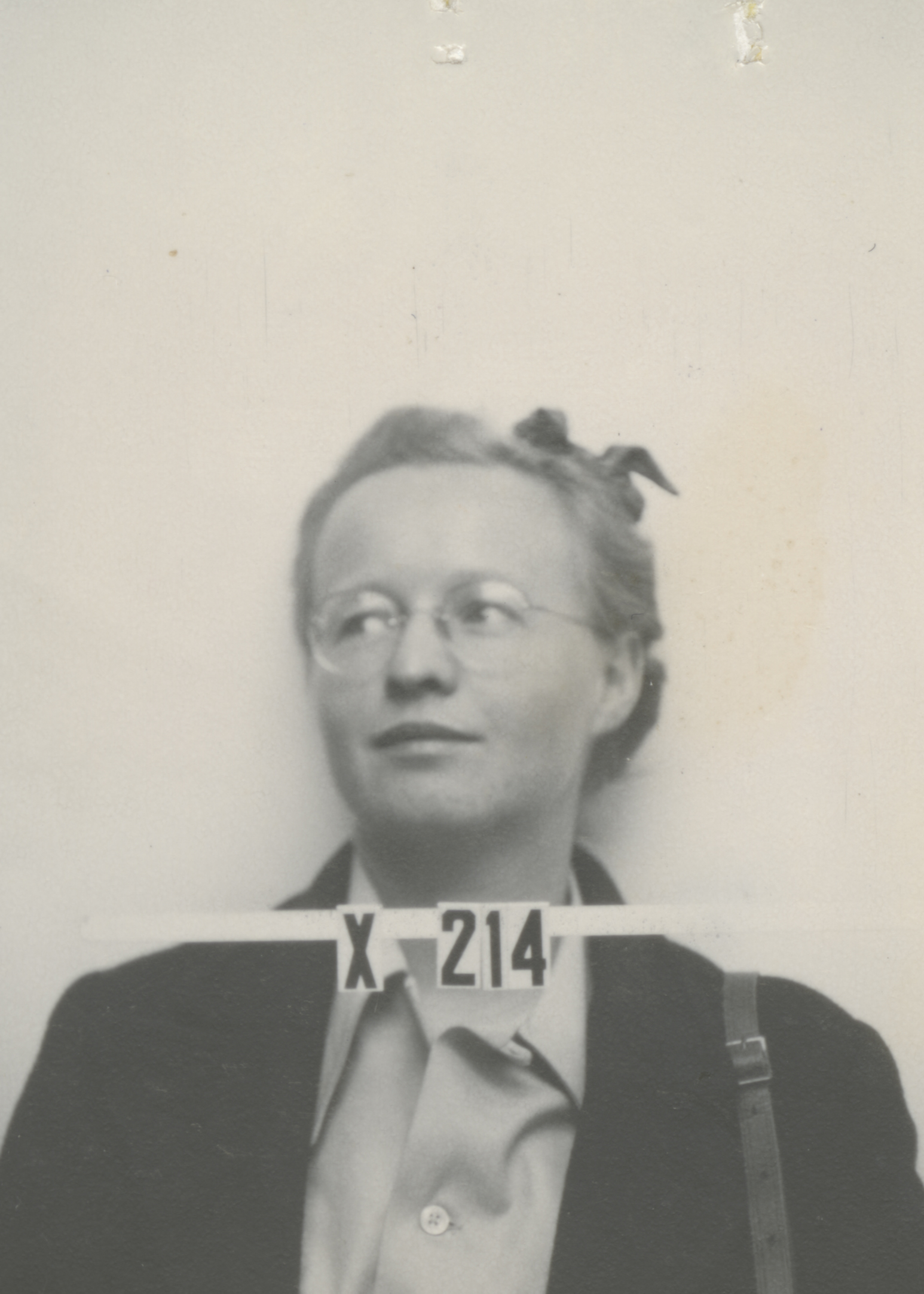
Mary Frankel Los Alamos badge

Mathematician Dana Mitchell noticed that the Marchant calculators broke under heavy use and persuaded Frankel and Nelson to order IBM 601 punched card machines. This experience led to Frankel's interest in the then-dawning field of digital computers. In August 1945, Frankel and Nick Metropolis traveled to the Moore School of Engineering in Pennsylvania to learn how to program the ENIAC computer. That fall they helped design a calculation that would determine the likelihood of being able to develop a fusion weapon. Edward Teller used the ENIAC results to prepare a report in the spring of 1946 that answered this question in the affirmative.

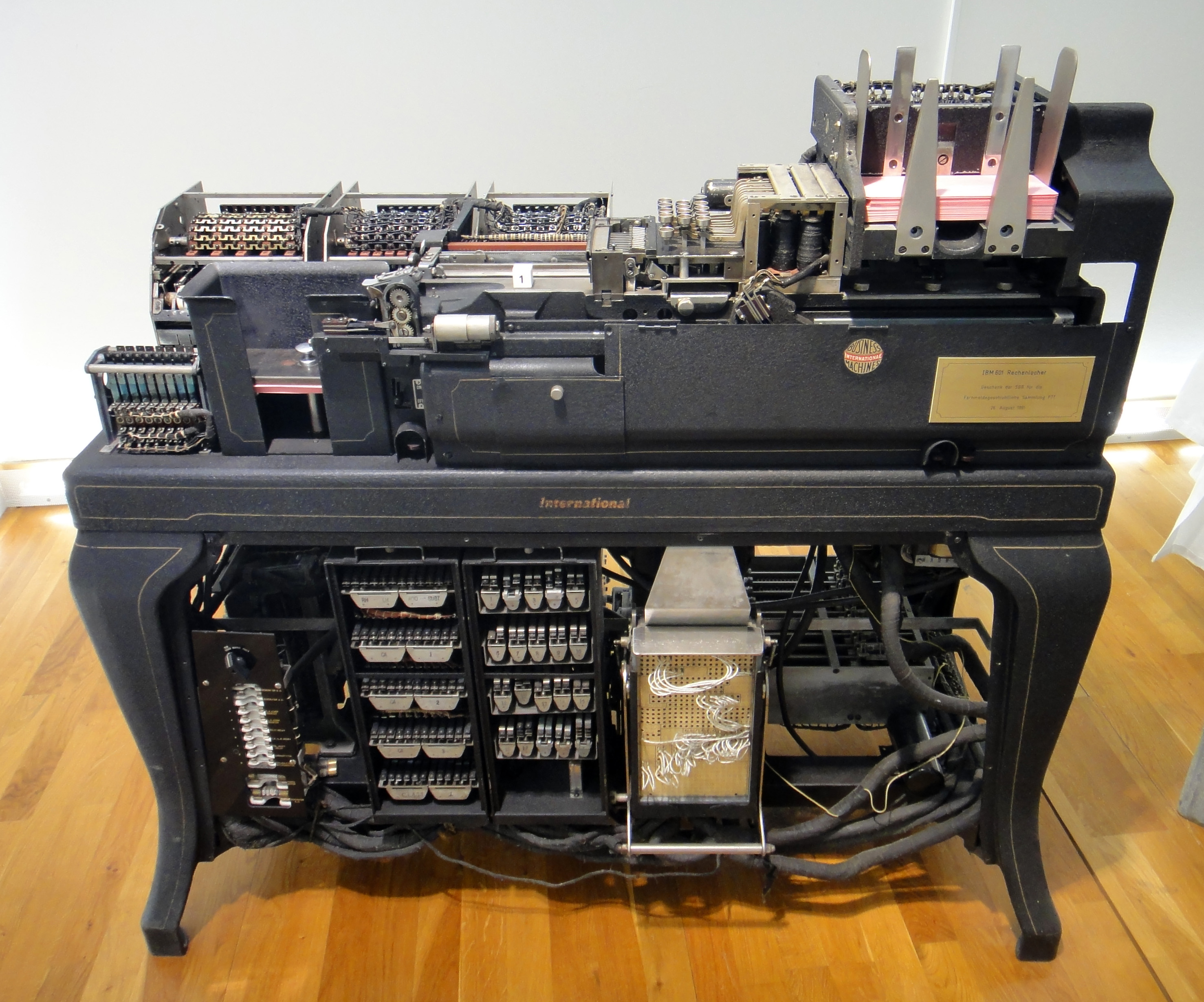
IBM 601 Multiplying Punch

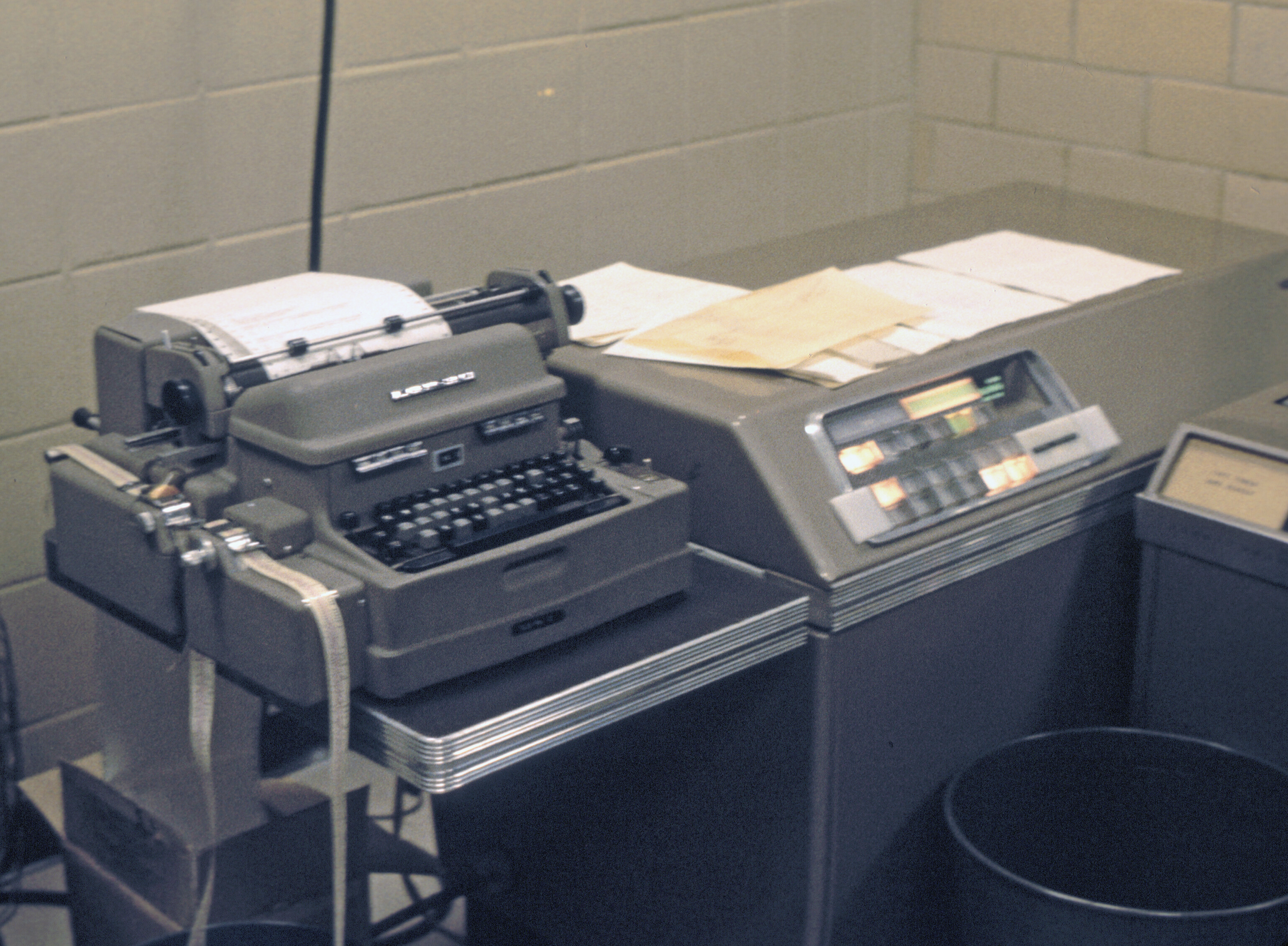
A 1956 Librascope LGP-30 "desk computer"

After losing his security clearance (and thus his job) during the red scare of the early 1950s, Frankel became an independent computer consultant. He was responsible for designing the CONAC computer for the Continental Oil Company during 1954–1957 and the LGP-30 single-user desk computer in 1956, which was licensed from a computer he designed at Caltech called MINAC. The LGP-30 was moderately successful, selling over 500 units. He served as a consultant to Packard Bell Computer on the design of the PB-250 computer.

Later in his career, he became involved in the development of desktop electronic calculators. The first calculator project he was involved in the development of was the SCM Marchant Cogito 240 and 240SR electronic calculators introduced in 1965. In the interest of improving upon the design of what became the SCM Cogito 240 and 240SR calculators, Frankel developed a new machine he called NIC-NAC, which was based on a microcoded architecture. NIC-NAC was built in prototype form in his home as a proof-of-concept and the machine worked well. Due to its microcoded implementation, the machine was very efficient in terms the number of components it required. Frankel, though his connections at SCM, was put in contact with Diehl, a West-German calculating machine company well-known in Europe for its exquisitely designed electro-mechanical calculators. Diehl wanted to break into the electronic calculator marketplace, but did not have the expertise itself. Frankel was contracted to develop a desktop electronic calculator for Diehl, and moved to West Germany to undertake the project. The project resulted in a calculator called the Diehl Combitron. The Combitron was a desktop printing electronic calculator that was also user programmable. The calculator utilized the concepts behind NIC-NAC's microcoded architecture, loading its microcode into a magnetostrictive delay line at power-up via an internal punched stainless steel tape that contained the microcode. Another magnetostrictive delay line contained the working registers, memory registers, and user program. The Combitron design was later augmented to include the ability to attach external input/output devices, with this machine called the Combitron S. Frankel's microcoded architecture would serve as the basis for a number of follow-on calculators developed and marketed by Diehl. SCM later became an OEM customer of Diehl, marketing the Combitron as the SCM Marchant 556PR.

== Scientific papers ==
Frankel published a number of scientific papers throughout his career. Some of them explored the use of statistical sampling techniques and machine driven solutions. In a 1947 paper in Physical Review, he and Metropolis predicted the utility of computers in replacing manual integration with iterative summation as a problem solving technique. As head of a new Caltech digital computing group he worked with PhD candidate Berni Alder in 1949–1950 to develop what is now known as Monte Carlo analysis. They used techniques that Enrico Fermi had pioneered in the 1930s. Due to a lack of local computing resources, Frankel travelled to England in 1950 to run Alder's project on the Manchester Mark 1 computer. Unfortunately, Alder's thesis advisor was unimpressed, so Alder and Frankel delayed publication of their results until 1955, in the Journal of Chemical Physics. This left the major credit for the technique to a parallel project by a team including Teller and Metropolis who published similar work in the same journal in 1953.

In September, 1959, Frankel published a paper in IRE Transactions on Electronic Computers proposing a microwave computer that used travelling-wave tubes as digital storage devices, similar to, but faster than the acoustic delay lines used in the early 1950s. Frankel published a paper on measuring the thickness of soap films in the Journal of Applied Physics in 1966.

== Publications ==
- Frankel, S. Phillips, “Elementary Derivation of Thermal Diffusion”, Physical Review, Volume 57, Number 7, April 1, 1940, p. 661.
- Frankel, S. and N Metropolis, “Calculations in the Liquid-Drop Model of Fission”, Physical Review, Volume 72, Number 10, November 15, 1947, p. 914–925.
- Frankel, Stanley P., “Convergence Rates of Iterative Treatments of Partial Differential Equations”, Mathematical Tables and Other Aids to Computation, Volume 4, 1950, p. 65–75.
- Frankel, S. P., “The Logical Design of a Simple General Purpose Computer”, IRE Transactions on Electronic Computers, March 1957, p. 5–14.
- Frankel, S. P., “On the Minimum Logical Complexity Required for a General Purpose Computer”, IRE Transactions on Electronic Computers, December 1958, p. 282–284.
- Frankel, Stanley P., “A Logic Design for a Microwave Computer”, IRE Transactions on Electronic Computers, September 1959, p. 271–276.
- Frankel, Stanley P. and Karol J. Mysels, “On the ‘Dimpling’ During the Approach of Two Surfaces”, Journal of Physical Chemistry, Volume 66, January 1962, p. 190–191.
- Frankel, Stanley P. and Karol J. Mysels, “Simplified Theory of Reflectometric Thickness Measurement of Structured Soap and Related Films”, Journal of Applied Physics, Volume 37, Number 10, September 1966, p. 3725–3728.
