= Walter S. Johnson =

American businessman (1884–1978)

- Born: 1884; East Saginaw, Michigan
- Died: 1978
- Education: Latter-day Saint Gila Academy
- Occupation: Businessman
- Known for: Co-founder of American Forest Products Corporation and Friden, Inc.

Walter S. Johnson (1884–1978) was a notable businessman and philanthropist in San Francisco, California. He was one of the founders of the American Forest Products Corporation, a Fortune 500 company in the 1950s and 1960s, and of Friden, Inc., the Friden Calculating Machine Company, which developed and sold electro-mechanical numerators and office equipment, predecessors of today's computerized counterparts. As a philanthropist, Walter S. Johnson is most famous for his 1959 contribution to the preservation of the Palace of Fine Arts, an act that ensured the endurance of the iconic San Francisco landmark.

== Early life ==
Walter S. Johnson was born in East Saginaw, Michigan in 1884. His father Alfred Johnson was a musician who wanted to move west and buy a farm. His mother Mary Augusta Calkins (sometimes spelled Caulkins), an educated daughter of a journalist, had no interest in a farming life. Despite her wishes, the family moved to California and eventually settled on a small farm in Tulare.

Mary became deeply unhappy and moved to San Francisco to pursue a newspaper career, leaving Walter and his four siblings in the temporary care of their father. Mary was hired by The San Francisco Call newspaper and was a regular contributor, reviewing books and interviewing authors and celebrities (The Call later became The San Francisco Call-Bulletin and eventually The San Francisco Examiner.) In the late 1890s, she had the good fortune to work with Fremont Older, the charismatic editor of The Call Bulletin. Older was remarkably unbiased toward women in the newspaper field, believing "whoever could best do the story got the job". Mary not only interviewed such names as Jack London, Gertrude Atherton, and Sarah Bernhart, but also got the daring "scoop" on the subjects of renowned trials and events including murderers and pugilists.

Eventually, Mary and Alfred officially divorced. The three young daughters, Ruth, Cornelia and Harriet, went to live with their mother, who later remarried, while the boys, Walter and Alfred Jr., stayed with their father. Greatly disheartened by his wife's departure and the divorce that followed, Alfred sold his farm, packed his two sons and all his belongings and headed out to sell musical instruments. The three intrepid travelers journeyed in a covered horse-drawn carriage through California to Oregon, back again and down to Arizona, where they eventually settled. In the crevice of time in the late 19th century before the total proliferation of the railways, roads and telegraph and before the population grew and native culture diminished, Walter was able to experience a final frontier. He and his father and brother fished, shot game, battled bears, braved rivers and weather, encountered Native Americans and collected a lifetime of memories.

Walter's formal education began in Safford, Arizona at the Latter-day Saint Gila Academy (the predecessor of the Eastern Arizona College) a Mormon school where he studied sales, bookkeeping and business law (one of only a few non-Mormons, Walter was given the good-natured moniker "Gentile" by his schoolmates). At the age of 17, Walter went to live with his mother and sisters in San Francisco. After working a number of odd jobs, Walter landed a job as a circulation manager at The Bulletin newspaper.

== Earthquake ==
"At 5:13 AM on April 18, 1906, I was awakened by a roaring noise. The house and earth shook, power poles and trees shuddered and waved in the air as if being blown by a strong wind... ." Johnson was 21 when the 1906 earthquake struck SF. The wood and brick house he lived in at 929 Jackson Street shook and trembled, later to burn to the ground. His quick-witted mother and brother-in-law directed the clan to the Ferry Building, one grouping making the only ferry trip to Sausalito, another making the trip in a rowboat.

Johnson and a friend, Tom Truxell, were able to salvage some of the family belongings and keep them from looters by burying valuables in the yard and taking a second load to the Presidio. Once at the Presidio, both young men were immediately assigned jobs protecting and accounting food items warehoused at the site. These were to be distributed by the army to the refugees encamped in Golden Gate Park and similar areas around the city. Johnson worked for a month aiding the relief effort. He drove out of the city to procure milk, drove wagons full of hospital mattresses and supplies from the Letterman General Hospital to the refugees, and, as every pedestrian in the city was required, helped clear streets.

Two of the best earthquake stories come from Walter Johnson's half brother, Henry Brooke:

Walter, living half as a refugee and half a relief agent, had a bedroll that he rolled a few garments in and tucked away in the bushes until needed. Once, upon returning one night, he discovered a pair of pants were missing. In their place were two beautiful brass candlesticks and a note that read: "Very sorry, just had to have the pants!"

An amusing ditty of the time surrounded the unscathed whiskey warehouse at the bottom of Folsom (Howard?):

If, as they say, God spanked the city
because it got too frisky,
Why did he shake the churches down
and save Hotelings whiskey?

Shortly after the earthquake, Walter Johnson gathered the newsboys he knew from his job at the Bulletin and started selling out-of-town newspapers and magazines. His first newsstand stood in the rubble of Fillmore Street. He was soon selling papers all across the city. This endeavor blossomed into a book and stationery store on Fillmore and then on Market Street. In 1911, Johnson and his brother Alfred opened a similar store in Modesto, where their father had relocated.

== World War I ==
Not satisfied with the life of a merchant, Johnson began to study for entrance into law school. He sold his share of the business to his brother and enrolled at Boalt Hall School of Law, later finishing at Hastings Law School in San Francisco. The very day Johnson became a member of the California bar, Archduke Franz Ferdinand of Austria was assassinated in Serbia, setting off World War I.

Johnson joined the war effort when the US became involved in 1917. He closed his small law practice and spent three months in officer's training at the Presidio. As a First Lieutenant, Johnson was sent to Aberdeen, Washington to disrupt the anti-war efforts of the Industrial Workers of the World, or I.W.W., targeting the local timber industry. As a lawyer and business manager, Johnson used his skills to persuade workers to continue production, and by extension, remove I.W.W members from positions of power. His legal and business skills were again used as the war wound down and he was transferred to New York City to settle government contracts with war-materials factories that were closing down. Johnson had made Captain by the time he left the Army.

== Big business ==
After the war, Johnson returned to San Francisco and his law practice. On occasion, an old childhood friend by the name of Bert Webster would drop in. Webster was in the wood box business in Stockton with a fellow named Horace Tarter. The three became fast friends and Johnson was convinced to move his family to Stockton where he incorporated and looked after the legal matters of Tartar and Webster. The Stockton Box Company, under what became Tartar, Webster & Johnson, Inc., flourished. Johnson soon learned the ropes, selling large quantities of wooden crates to suppliers and directly to fruit growers and canneries.

Soon, Tartar, Webster & Johnson, Inc. enlarged its holdings by acquiring interests in several other box and lumber companies. Johnson foresaw the need to control the raw materials that were the heart of the box business. He was also convinced that lumber would be highly valued commodity as industry and population grew. San Francisco became the center of the lumber business and Johnson operated an office at 1 Montgomery Street, in the Crocker Bank Building. Unfortunately, his friends and partners in the box company were not eager to branch out. Tartar and Webster sold out to Johnson, keeping the Stockton Box Company under their own guidance. Several years later, the three reunited as Johnson's vision began to pay off. The reunited corporation became the American Forest Products Corporation.

The year was 1927 and the new corporation soon encircled a wide range of forest products. Besides the box industry, there were timber holdings, saw mills, re-manufacturing plants and complete lumber sales and distribution divisions. With good management and strong business ethics, it weathered the depression and by the end of World War II, the corporation was a multi million-dollar operation.

It was during the depression years that Johnson met Carl Friden, a Swedish-born engineer who had perfected and patented a revolutionary calculator. Friden had been very successful with his designs, but had met ruin with the stock market crash of 1929. In 1933, after Friden had spent years trying to perfect his product and find backers, he met Charles Gruenhagen, Johnson's brother-in-law. Gruenhagen was intrigued by Friden's accomplishments and introduced him to Johnson and members of the AFPC board. Friden proposed selling half interest to Johnson for $25,000, the funds to get his company off the ground. Johnson split the obligation with his partners and the Friden company began production.

Johnson's investment paid off well. Friden's plant in San Leandro, California grew to consist of 50,000 square feet (4,600 m^{2}) of facilities and employed over 500 people. During World War II, the plant was restricted to making only 25 calculators a day, while the skilled machinists and engineers were redirected to make complicated bomb fuses and tachometers. After the war, the plant continued to make delicate instruments and expanded its line of calculating products, catering to the needs of scientists, businesses and industry.

Carl M. Friden died in 1945, leaving the company in turmoil. His heirs and company trustees turned to Johnson for his vision and expertise. Johnson, a highly experienced executive, was named president of the Friden Company. As he had done with the American Forest Products Corporation, Johnson turned the reasonably profitable enterprise into a multi million-dollar outfit. Aggressive sales and progressive research and development were the mottoes for the energized Friden Company.

Not content with simple success, Johnson was determined to expand the Friden Company worldwide. By the mid-1950s the organization had moved into complete office machine outfitting, producing adding machines, typesetting machines, weight scales and postage meters. Johnson had a fight on his hands trying to convince his complacent board members to move into the international market. Eventually, he won out and headed to Europe, opening offices in the Netherlands and Belgium. European sales surged and offices sprung up in Italy, England and West Germany. Johnson found himself a world traveler as he made the rounds of the Friden family of companies. Friden grew and profited, becoming well known for its punched-tape typewriters, including the iconic Flexowriter.

Years later, in 1963, the company was sold to the Singer Company, which had become a billion-dollar worldwide conglomerate. Johnson and the Friden board felt Singer had the experience and the capital to keep Friden expanding. Seven years later, the American Forest Products Corporation was sold to the Bendix Corporation. Johnson had been the president of both Friden and AFPC for nearly 50 years.

== Personal life and legacy ==
Walter Johnson met Mabel Brady at his stationery store in Modesto. They were married in 1914, shortly before Johnson's graduation from law school. They had three children together, Gloria, Jeneal and Walter, the latter being born in 1924.

As a young couple, Mabel and Walter Johnson had the good fortune to be living in San Francisco as the Panama-Pacific Exposition was being planned and built. The expo was to be a grand celebration of the opening of the new Panama Canal, but would also let the world know that San Francisco had risen like a phoenix from the ashes of the 1906 earthquake and fire. Strewn over what had been a marshy shore, some thirty palaces of science, art and culture, statehood, and industry sprung into existence only a few years after the first shovel was turned. Fountains, towers, gardens and esplanades were to greet guests from around the world. In February 1915, the fair opened to a crowd of 255,149 and welcomed such notables as Teddy Roosevelt, Woodrow Wilson, Thomas Edison and Charlie Chaplin, and even the Philadelphia Liberty Bell.

Considered by many the most romantic feature of the fair, the Palace of Fine Arts was the favorite spot of the newlyweds. Designed by Bernard Maybeck, the building was surrounded by a handsome lagoon and illuminated beautifully. Walter and Mabel Johnson were not the only admirers. The people of San Francisco were so enamored with the palace that it was the only building to remain in place after the demolition of the expo.

Unfortunately, the structure had not been constructed to last. For many years after the fair, the crumbling building continued to be a San Francisco point of interest and pride, drawing visitors from all over the world. But, by 1959, the landmark was in jeopardy. California Representative Caspar Weinberger sponsored a state assembly bill offering $2 million in restoration funds if the city of San Francisco would match it. The city faltered and Johnson stepped up to the plate, donating the needed $2 million to the project. The state funds kicked in and work on the palace began. Johnson continued to contribute to the palace for the rest of his life. In tribute, the city named the surrounding grounds the Walter S. Johnson Park.

The palace was not the first historic building that interested Johnson. The Augustin Bernal Adobe house in Pleasanton, California and the surrounding ranch land were purchased by Johnson in 1940. Many elements of the old adobe were carefully restored and Johnson enjoyed living on the ranch for many years.

Historical preservation was not Johnson's only passion. Throughout his life, he served on the boards of many charitable organizations and contributed to numerous worthy causes. One such cause was a children's home established by his childhood friend, Ettie Lee. In 1950 Ms. Lee started Ettie Lee Homes. Today, her mission is fulfilled through Ettie Lee Youth & Family Services—Saving Lives, Changing Lives, Building Hope (www.ettielee.org). He was touched by the plight of disadvantaged youth and began a foundation to serve the needs of youth in Northern California. Today, the Walter S. Johnson Foundation continues his legacy, funding education, leadership and economic development programs for youth and families.
