= EC130 =

EC130 or EC-130 may refer to:

- Eurocopter EC130, a helicopter
- Lockheed EC-130, an electronic warfare fixed wing aircraft
- Friden EC-130, a desktop electronic calculator
