= Mechanical computer =

Computer built from mechanical components such as levers and gears

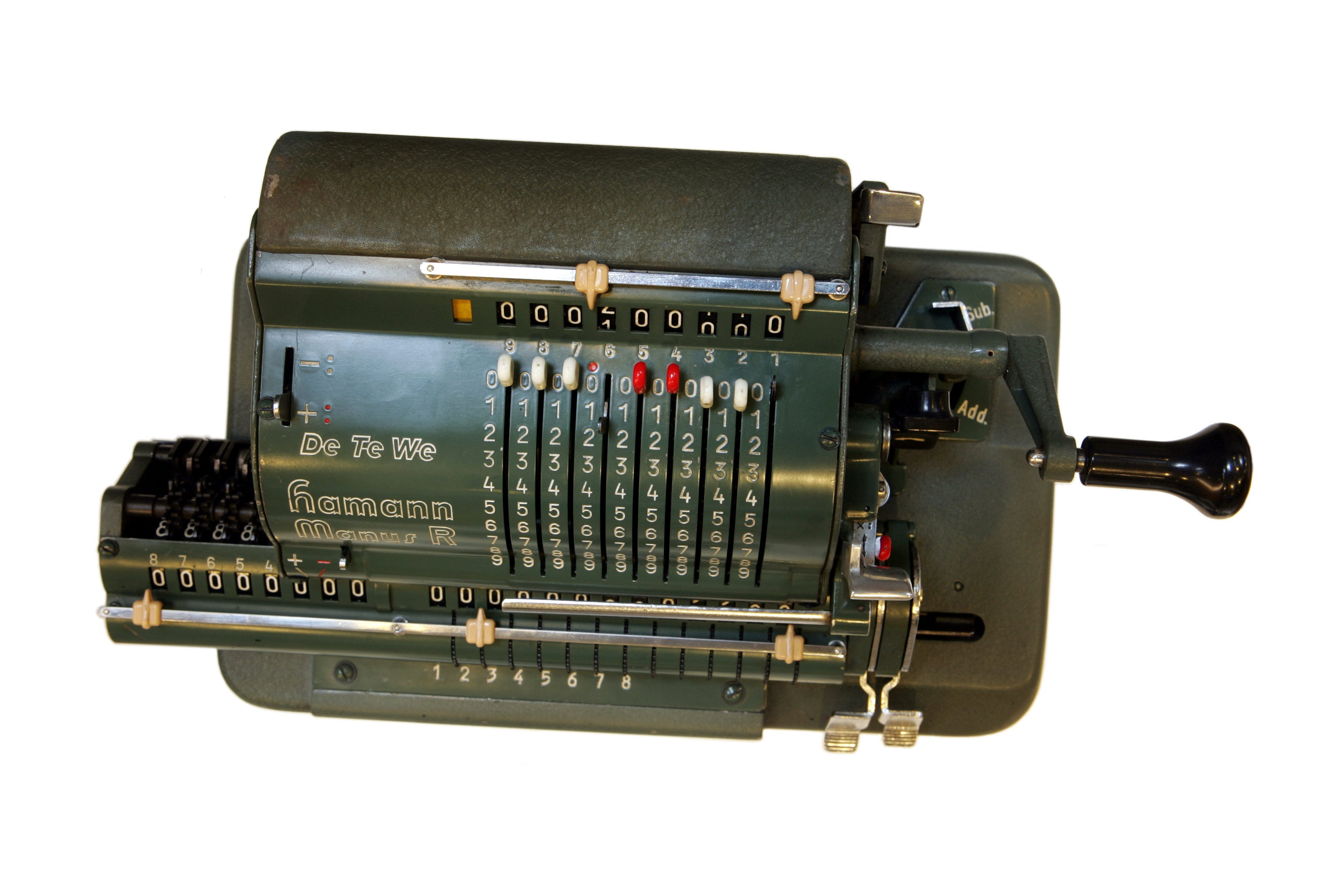
Hamman Manus R mechanical computer, produced in Germany by the DeTeWe company between 1953 and 1959

A mechanical computer is a computer built from mechanical components such as levers and gears rather than electronic components. The most common examples are adding machines and mechanical counters, which use the turning of gears to increment output displays. More complex examples could carry out multiplication and division—Friden used a moving head which paused at each column—and even differential analysis. One model, the Ascota 170 accounting machine sold in the 1960s, calculated square roots.

Mechanical computers can be either analog, using continuous or smooth mechanisms such as curved plates or slide rules for computations; or discrete, which use mechanisms like pinwheels and gears.

Mechanical computers reached their zenith during World War II, when they formed the basis of complex bombsights including the Norden, as well as the similar devices for ship computations such as the US Torpedo Data Computer or British Admiralty Fire Control Table. Noteworthy are mechanical flight instruments for early spacecraft, which provided their computed output not in the form of digits, but through the displacements of indicator surfaces. From Yuri Gagarin's first spaceflight in 1961 until 2002, every crewed Soviet and Russian spacecraft Vostok, Voskhod and Soyuz was equipped with a Globus instrument showing the apparent movement of the Earth under the spacecraft through the displacement of a miniature terrestrial globe, plus latitude and longitude indicators.

Mechanical computers continued to be used into the 1960s, but had steadily been losing ground to digital computers since their advent. By the mid-1960s dedicated electronic calculators with cathode-ray tube output emerged. The next step in the evolution occurred in the 1970s, with the introduction of inexpensive handheld electronic calculators. The use of mechanical computers declined in the 1970s and was rare by the 1980s. According to a mechanical engineer who operated the German corvette Hiddensee while it was examined by the United States Navy, the Soviets still made use of mechanical computers to calculate the target coordinates for their missiles in the late 80s.

In 2016, NASA announced that its Automaton Rover for Extreme Environments program would use a mechanical computer to operate in the harsh environmental conditions found on Venus.

== Examples ==
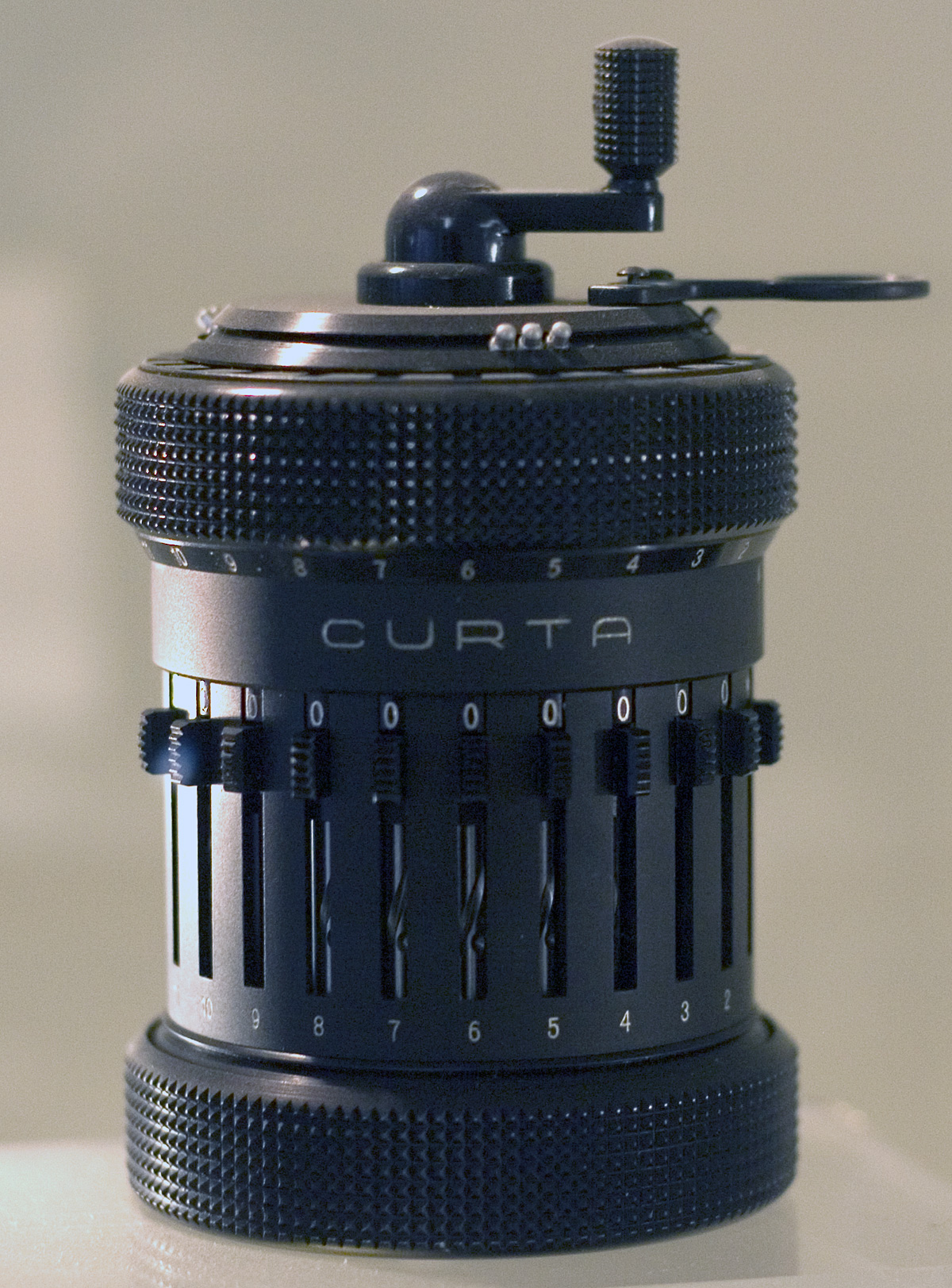
Curta Calculator

- Antikythera mechanism, c. 100 BC – A mechanical astronomical clock.
- Cosmic Engine, 1092 – Su Song's hydro-mechanical astronomical clock tower invented during the Song dynasty, which featured the use of an early escapement mechanism applied to clockwork.
- Castle clock, 1206 – Al-Jazari's castle clock, a hydropowered mechanical astronomical clock, has been described as the earliest programmable analog computer.
- The Astrarium was a complex astronomical clock built in 1348 by Giovanni Dondi dell'Orologio. The Astrarium had seven faces and 107 moving parts; it could show and predict the positions of the sun, the moon, stars and the five planets then known, as well as religious feast days.
- Pascaline, 1642 – Blaise Pascal's arithmetic machine primarily intended as an adding machine which could add and subtract two numbers directly, as well as multiply and divide by repetition.
- Stepped Reckoner, 1672 – Gottfried Wilhelm Leibniz's mechanical calculator that could add, subtract, multiply, and divide.
- Difference Engine, 1822 – Charles Babbage's mechanical device to calculate polynomials.
- Analytical Engine, 1837 – A later Charles Babbage device that could be said to encapsulate most of the elements of modern computers.
- Odhner Arithmometer, 1873 – W. T. Odhner's calculator who had millions of clones manufactured until the 1970s.
- Ball-and-disk integrator, 1886 – William Thomson used it in his Harmonic Analyser to measure tide heights by calculating coefficients of a Fourier series.
- Algebraic Machines, 1893 – Leonardo Torres Quevedo's analog calculating machines designed to solve algebraic equations and find roots of polynomials. They featured the Endless Spindle (Huso sin fin), a mechanism used to calculate logarithms mechanically with high precision.
- Dumaresq, 1902 – Royal Navy fire control computer
- Percy Ludgate's 1909 Analytical Machine – The 2nd of only two mechanical Analytical Engines ever designed.
- Dreyer Fire Control Table, 1911 – Royal Navy fire control computer
- Marchant Calculator, 1918 – Most advanced of the mechanical calculators. The key design was by Carl Friden.
- Admiralty Fire Control Table, 1922 – Royal Navy advanced fire control computer.
- István Juhász Gamma-Juhász (gun director) (early 1930s)
- Kerrison Predictor ("late 1930s"?)
- Z1, 1938 (ready in 1941) – Konrad Zuse's mechanical calculator (although part imprecisions hindered its function)
- Mark I Fire Control Computer, deployed by the United States Navy during World War II (1939 to 1945) and up to 1969 or later.
- Curta calculator, 1948
- MONIAC, 1949 – An analog computer used to model or simulate the UK economy.
- Voskhod Spacecraft "Globus" IMP navigation instrument, early 1960s
- Digi-Comp I, 1963 – An educational 3-bit digital computer
- Digi-Comp II, mid 1960s – A rolling ball digital computer
- Automaton – Mechanical devices that, in some cases, can store data and perform calculations, and perform other complicated tasks.
- Turing Tumble, 2017 – An educational Turing-complete computer partially inspired by the Digi-Comp II.
- Slide calculator, around 1845 - Also known as Addiator, is a mechanical calculator capable of addition and subtraction using a carry mechanism.

== Punch card data processing ==
Starting at the end of the nineteenth century, well before the advent of electronic computers, data processing was performed using electromechanical machines collectively referred to as unit record equipment, electric accounting machines (EAM) or tabulating machines. By 1887, Herman Hollerith had worked out the basis for a mechanical system of recording, compiling and tabulating census facts. "Unit record" data processing equipment uses punchcards to carry information on a one-item-per-card basis. Unit record machines came to be as ubiquitous in industry and government in the first two-thirds of the twentieth century as computers became in the last third. They allowed large volume, sophisticated data-processing tasks to be accomplished before electronic computers were invented and while they were still in their infancy. This data processing was accomplished by processing punched cards through various unit record machines in a carefully choreographed progression. Data on the cards could be added, subtracted and compared with other data and, later, multiplied as well. This progression, or flow, from machine to machine was often planned and documented with detailed flowcharts. All but the earliest machines had high-speed mechanical feeders to process cards at rates from around 100 to 2,000 per minute, sensing punched holes with mechanical, electrical, or, later, optical sensors. The operation of many machines was directed by the use of a removable plugboard, control panel, or connection box.

== Electro-mechanical computers ==
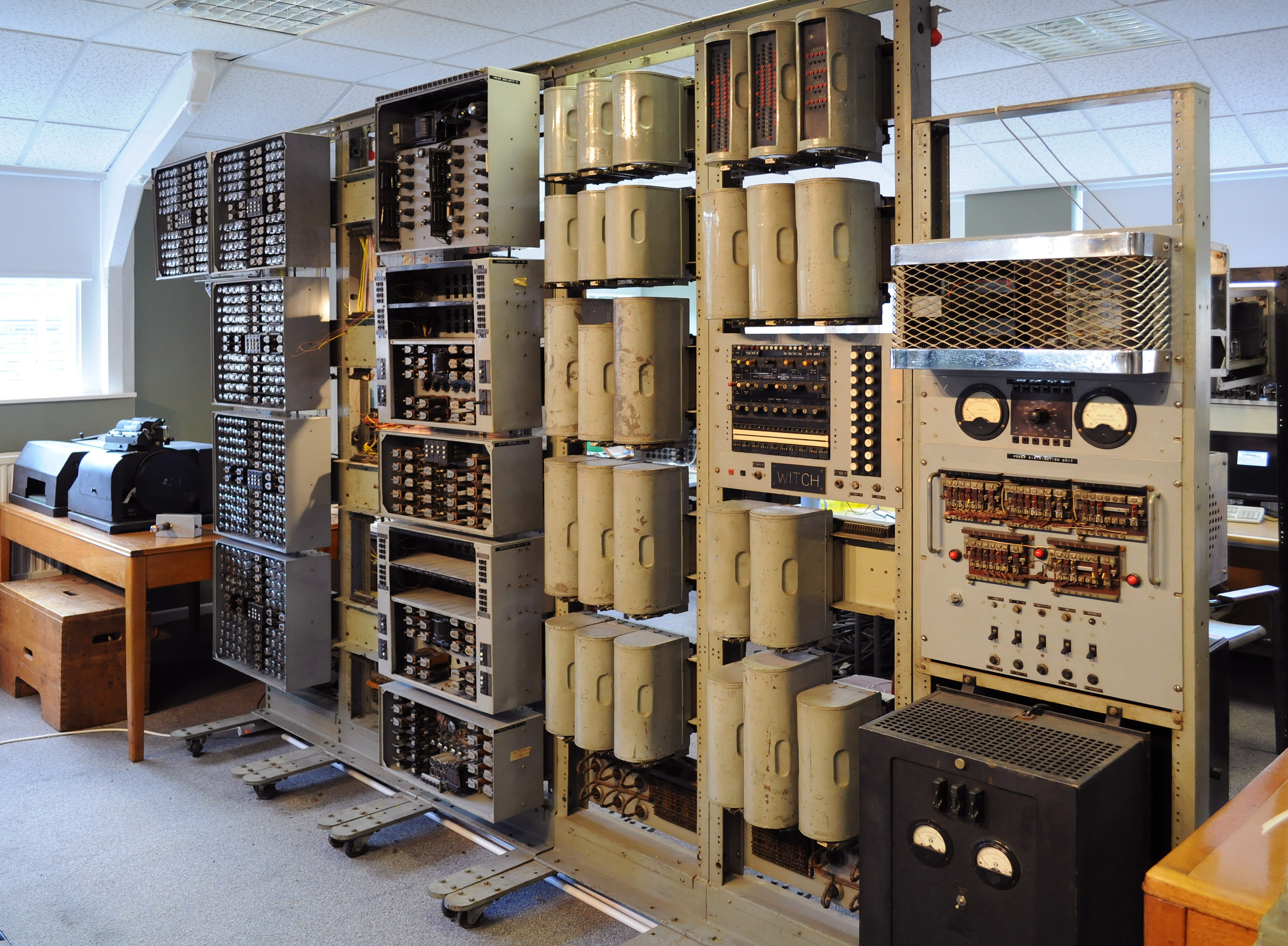
Harwell Dekatron

Early electrically powered computers constructed from switches and relay logic rather than vacuum tubes (thermionic valves) or transistors (from which later electronic computers were constructed) are classified as electro-mechanical computers. These varied greatly in design and capabilities, with some units capable of floating point arithmetic. Some relay-based computers remained in service after the development of vacuum-tube computers, where their slower speed was compensated for by good reliability. Some models were built as duplicate processors to detect errors, or could detect errors and retry the instruction. A few models were sold commercially with multiple units produced, but many designs were experimental one-off productions.

Name	Country	Year	Remarks	Reference
Automatic Relay Computer	UK	1948	The Booths, experimental	
ARRA	Netherlands	1952	experimental	
BARK	Sweden	1952	experimental	
ETL Mark I	Japan	1952	experimental, asynchronous	
FACOM-100	Japan	1954	Fujitsu commercial, asynchronous	
FACOM-128	Japan	1956	commercial	
Harwell computer	UK	1951	later known as WITCH	
Harvard Mark I	United States	1944	"IBM Automatic Sequence Controlled Calculator"	
Harvard Mark II	USA	1947	"Aiken Relay Calculator"	
IBM SSEC	USA	1948		
Imperial College Computing Engine (ICCE)	UK	1951	Electro-mechanical	
Office of Naval Research ONR Relay Computer	USA	1949	6-bit, drum storage, but electro-mechanical relay ALU based on Atlas, formerly Navy cryptology computer ABEL	
OPREMA	East Germany	1955	Commercial use at Zeiss Optical in Jena	
RVM-1	Soviet Union	1957	Nikolay Bessonov, Alexander Kronrod	
SAPO	Czechoslovakia	1957		
Simon	USA	1950	Hobbyist logic demonstrator magazine article	
Z2	Germany	1940	Konrad Zuse	
Z3	Germany	1941	Zuse	
Z4	Germany	1945	Zuse	
Z5	Germany	1953	Zuse	
Z11	Germany	1955	Zuse, commercial	
Bell Labs Model I	USA	1940	George Stibitz, "Complex Number Calculator", 450 relays and crossbar switches, demonstrated remote access 1940, used until 1948	
Bell Labs Model II	USA	1943	"Relay Interpolator", used for wartime work, shut down 1962	
Bell Labs Model III	USA	1944	"Ballistic Computer", used until 1949	
Bell Labs Model IV	USA	1945	Navy "Mark 22 Error Detector", used until 1961	
Bell Labs Model V	USA	1946, 1947	Two units delivered, general-purpose, built in trigonometric functions, floating-point arithmetic	
Bell Labs Model VI	USA	1949	General purpose, simplified Model V with several enhancements	
Unnamed cryptanalysis multiplier	UK	1937	Alan Turing	

== See also ==
- Analog computer
- Billiard-ball computer
- Domino computer
- History of computing hardware
- List of pioneers in computer science
- Mechanical calculator
- Spirule
- Tide-Predicting Machine No. 2
- Turing completeness
