= Yue Xia Wang Fridén =

Chinese table tennis player

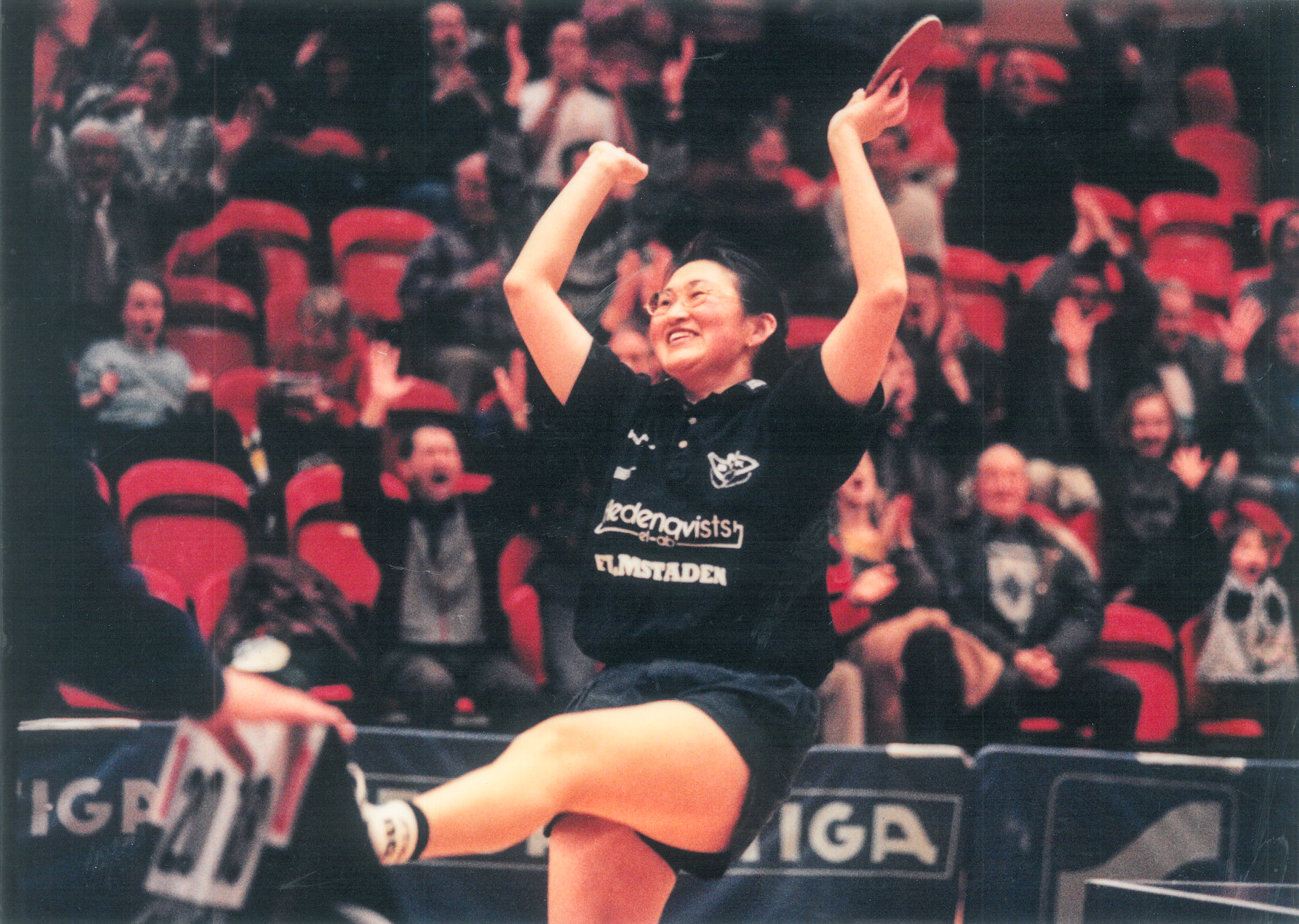

Personal information
- Full name: Yue Xia Wang Fridén
- Nationality: Swedish
- Born: 13 November 1962 (age 63) Jiujiang, China

Sport
- Sport: Table tennis
- Playing style: Attacker
Medal record
Women's table tennis
Representing Sweden
Swedish Championships
Gold medal – first place	1998	Team
Bronze medal – third place	1998	Doubles

Yue Xia Wang Fridén, born November 13, 1962, in Jiujiang, China, is a Swedish-Chinese table tennis player. Wang Fridén won the Swedish Championship for ladies in team 1998 with Norrköping's BTK. She has also received another 26 gold, one World Cup silver, two World Cup bronze, two European Championship silver and three gold in the Nordic Championship in the veteran class.
