= Automaton Rover for Extreme Environments =

NASA design project

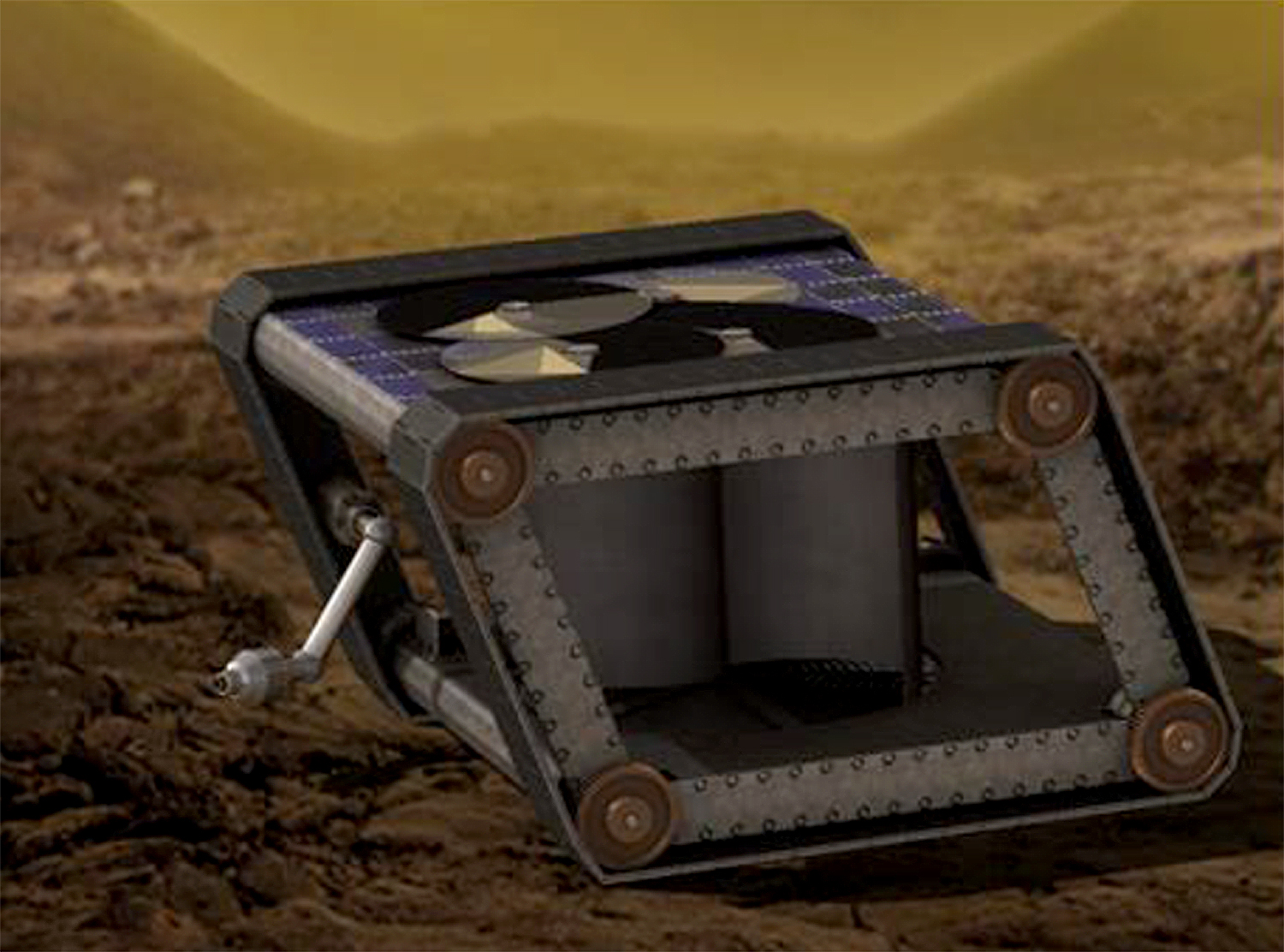
Artist's conception of AREE on the surface of Venus, showing the wind turbine inside the rover's frame.

Automaton Rover for Extreme Environments (AREE) is a NASA Innovative Advanced Concepts project to design a rover that can operate in the environment of Venus, controlled by a wind-powered mechanical computer. Venus's atmosphere is about 90 times denser than Earth's and the surface temperature is at least 462 °C (864 °F), conditions which would prevent a standard electronic computer from operating for any significant period of time. While AREE is being designed for operation on Venus, the rover's design could be re-purposed for use on Mercury, which has a comparably high surface temperature, on Jovian moons Europa or Io, where high radiation makes use of traditional electronics difficult, or on lava flows or highly radioactive areas on Earth.

The project was first proposed in 2015, and funded by the NASA Innovative Advanced Concepts program with a phase-I study in 2016, and a phase-II study from 2017 to 2018.

== Rover design ==
Though the JPL team initially planned to design an entirely mechanical rover, this was soon deemed to be impractical compared to a hybrid mechanical-electric design.

AREE's unique feature is the use of mechanical analog computers instead of electronic digital computers (as used in other robotic spacecraft), which cannot tolerate the high temperatures of Venus. Instead of using a single general-purpose mechanical computer, like Babbage's Analytical Engine, the rover would rely on a suite of simpler, single-purpose devices distributed throughout the vehicle, analogous to World War II shipboard fire control computers. The rover would also use purely mechanical sensors for some of its instrumentation: temperature, wind speed, barometric pressure, seismic activity, and even chemical composition of samples can be measured mechanically.

AREE is to be powered primarily by a Savonius wind turbine. The turbine would directly drive the wheels and also store energy in a composite spring. The rover would also carry high-temperature solar panels as a backup and for powering the electric scientific instruments.

The most challenging aspect of AREE's design is its communication with Earth. Multiple communication options are being explored, including a high temperature transponder, radar retroreflectors, and inscribing data on phonograph-style records that are then delivered to a high-altitude drone via hydrogen balloon.

== Target ==
AREE's proposed target is near Sekmet Mons. This target was chosen because it is outside the parabolas of impact debris from any of Venus's impact craters, thus allowing the rover to directly study Venus's volcanic geology. AREE would travel northwest from its landing zone, crossing (and sampling) several lava flows. The proposed landing site is also located near a Tessera region, raising the possibility that the rover's mission could end with it exploring the Tessera.
