= FACOM 100 =

Japanese relay-based electromechanical computer

The FACOM 100 was an early electromechanical computer built by Fujitsu in 1954 which used binary-coded decimal arithmetic.

The design of the later FACOM 128 was influenced by experience gained from building the FACOM 100.

== See also ==
- FACOM
