= American Forest Products Corporation =

Former American company

- Formerly: Stockton Manufacturing Company; Stockton Box Company; Bendix Forest Products Company
- Founded: 1910; 116 years ago in Stockton, California
- Founders: Horace Tarter; Clarence Albert Webster
- Key people: Walter S. Johnson
- Parent: Bendix Corporation (1969–1981); Kohlberg Kravis Roberts (1981–1988); Georgia-Pacific (from 1988)

American Forest Products Corporation (AFPC) was a Fortune 500 company initially producing wooden boxes and shipping materials but expanding into the timber, sawmill, and lumber industries. The company began in the 1920s and operated under the same leadership until it was sold to the Bendix Corporation in 1969.

== History ==
The company began in 1910 in Stockton, California as the Stockton Manufacturing Company, a joint effort of Horace Tartar and Clarence Albert Webster. The company produced wooden boxes used primarily by fruit growers and canners and shook, the material of shipping strips which were used to keep boxes from shifting in transit. In 1911, the company was renamed the Stockton Box Company. Tartar and Webster incorporated in 1918 and later included their legal partner, Walter S. Johnson, to become Tartar, Webster and Johnson, Inc.

The box company expanded in the 1920s to include timber, saw mills and lumber. The company name became the American Forest Products Corporation.

A listing of corporate holdings compiled in 1944 included:

- American Box Company, San Francisco, Stockton and Diamond Springs, CA, Sprague River, Oregon
- Stockton Box Company, Stockton, CA
- Wetsel Mill, Omo Ranch, CA
- Mt. Whitney Lumber Company, Johnsondale, CA
- Associated Lumber and Box company, Dorris and North Fork, CA
- Blagen Lumber Company, White Pine, CA
- Calaveras Forest Products Corp, Sandy Gulch and Toyon, CA
- General Box Distributor, San Jose and Fresno, CA
- Blyes-Jamison Lumber, Fresno, CA
- Harbor Box and Lumber Company, Los Angeles, CA
- Underwood Lumber, Lakeview, Oregon

In 1963, AFPC had 4 sawmills and 170,000 acres (688 km^{2}) of timberland in Northern California, and employed over 4000 workers in 49 location in 16 states.

AFPC was acquired by the Bendix Corporation in 1969 as Bendix sought to diversify outside its core automobile and defense business. The company was renamed Bendix Forest Products Company (BFPC). Following this purchase, in the early 1970s Bendix acquired the recreational vehicle and mobile home businesses of the troubled Boise Cascade Corporation which it reorganized as Bendix Home Systems expecting to see synergies between the lumber produced by BFPC and the new division. However, these synergies failed to materialize to the extent anticipated and Bendix sold off its Home Systems operations by the early 1980s. In another attempt to maximize benefit from BFPC, Bendix acquired Caradco, a wooden window manufacturer, from Scovill Inc. in 1979 and around the same time, acquired builders' supply outlet Bass and Company.

But, benefit from these acquisitions was never realized as Bendix sold BFPC in 1981 to Kohlberg Kravis Roberts (KKR) for US$425 million, a significant premium over its purchase price. Following its sale to KKR, the company was reorganized again under the name American Forest Products. Georgia-Pacific acquired AFPC in 1988.
