= Domino computer =

Mechanical computer built using dominoes

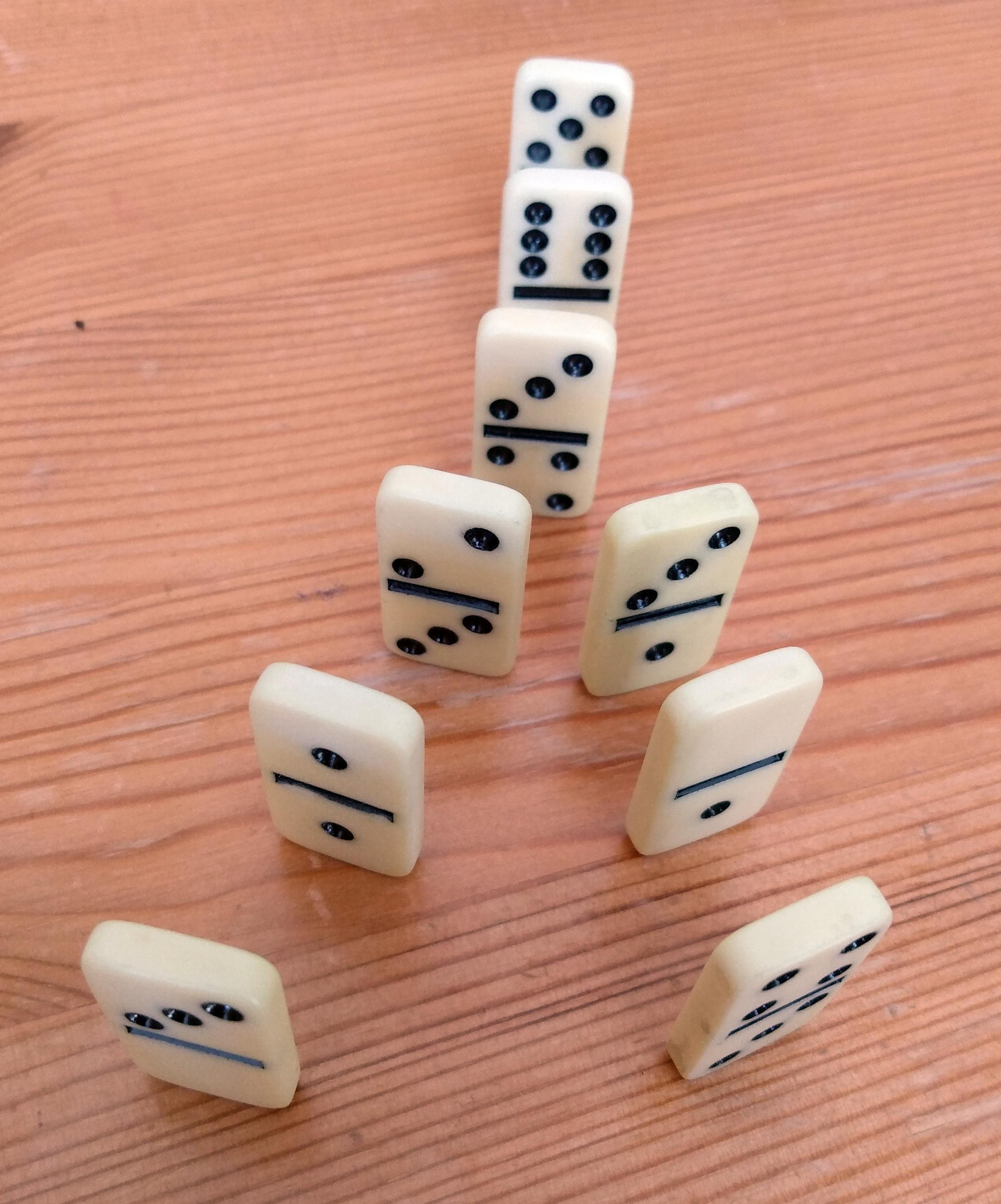
An OR gate built from dominoes, with the bottom left and bottom right dominoes as its inputs and the top domino as its output. If the bottom left or the bottom right domino is pushed (or if both are pushed), then the top domino will fall; if neither is pushed, it will not fall.

A domino computer is a mechanical computer built using dominoes to represent mechanical amplification or logic gating of digital signals.

== Basic phenomenon ==
Sequences of standing dominoes can be arranged to demonstrate digital concepts such as amplification and digital signals. Since digital information is conducted by a string of dominoes, this effect differs from phenomena where:

- energy is conducted without amplification, thus dissipating; or
- amplification is applied to non-digital signals, allowing noise effects to occur.

The Domino Day event shows many constructs, mainly for the purposes of entertainment. Some constructs are reminiscent of digital circuits, suggesting that not only telegraph-like tools can be shown, but also simple information processing modules.

It is possible to use this phenomenon for constructing unconventional computing tools. The base phenomenon is sufficient to achieve this goal, but "mechanical synapses" can also be used (see online), to the analogy of electrical synapses or chemical synapses.

== Logical aspects ==
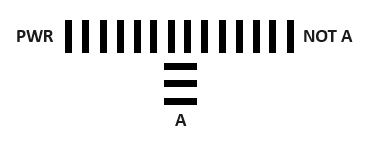
A NOT gate implemented in a domino computer; when A is knocked down, the path from PWR to NOT A is interrupted, so NOT A remains standing.

The two domino logic gates, from which, with the addition of NOT, all other gates can be built. The XOR gate is dependent on timing.

The logic OR gate is simple to make in dominoes, consisting of two domino paths in a Y-shape with the stem of the Y as the output. The complex piece is which gate is able to be added to OR to obtain a functionally complete set such that all logic gates can be represented.

No domino gate can produce output 1 with all inputs 0, so a NOT gate cannot be created unless an external 'power source' sequence (a line of dominoes that is knocked down no matter what) is included; in that case, the signal from the input can be used to hit the dominoes in the 'power source' sequence in the wrong direction, such that they are stopped from continuing on when they would have otherwise. It is, however, difficult to lead in a sequence from one 'power source' to many gates with suitable timing. An OR gate and a NOT gate are together functionally complete, allowing for any domino computer to be theoretically constructed under this paradigm.

In order to produce output 0 with all inputs 1, feedback is required to interrupt the path from the input signal P to the output signal Q such that the logic gate is equivalent to Q AND (NOT P). Similarly, an XOR gate can be realized with feedback from both inputs such that the two inputs interrupt each other if both are 1; however, such a gate heavily depends on the simultaneity of the inputs to prevent one input from destroying the opposite input's feedback loop.

== Record ==
The current record for the biggest domino computer is a 6-bit adder.

At the Manchester Science Festival in 2012, mathematician Matt Parker and a team of volunteers worked together to build a domino binary adder which could add two three-bit inputs and produce a 3-bit output, which ran successfully. The following day, they attempted to build a 4-bit adder, which they completed, but the final test run had some errors (one due to signal bleed between chains of dominoes, and one timing issue).

In 2018, at Bank Muscat headquarters in Oman, a team of American British Academy (ABA) Grade 12 students led by Saatvik Suryajit Korisepati, assisted by Alex Freyer, Zoltan Sojitory, and other computer students, used 15,000 dominoes to build a 5-bit adder able to add any numbers up to the sum of 63.

In January 2024, a team of Finnish high school students successfully built a 6-bit adder out of over 10,000 dominoes.

== See also ==
- Domino logic
- The concept is mentioned in the book I Am a Strange Loop by Douglas Hofstadter.
