= FACOM 128 =

Japanese relay-based electromechanical computer

The FACOM 128 was a relay-based electromechanical computer built by Fujitsu. Two models were made, namely the FACOM 128A, built in 1956, and the FACOM 128B, built in 1959. As of 2019, a fully working FACOM 128B is still in working order, maintained by Fujitsu staff at a facility in Numazu in Shizuoka Prefecture.

The FACOM 128B processes numbers using a bi-quinary coded decimal representation.

== See also ==
- FACOM 100
- FACOM
