= Norrköpings BTK =

Swedish table tennis club

- Full name: Norrköpings bordtennisklubb
- Sport: table tennis
- Based in: Norrköping, Sweden

Norrköpings BTK was a table tennis club in Norrköping, Sweden. The club won the Swedish national women's team championship during the season of 1997–1998.
