= Marchant Calculating Machine Company =

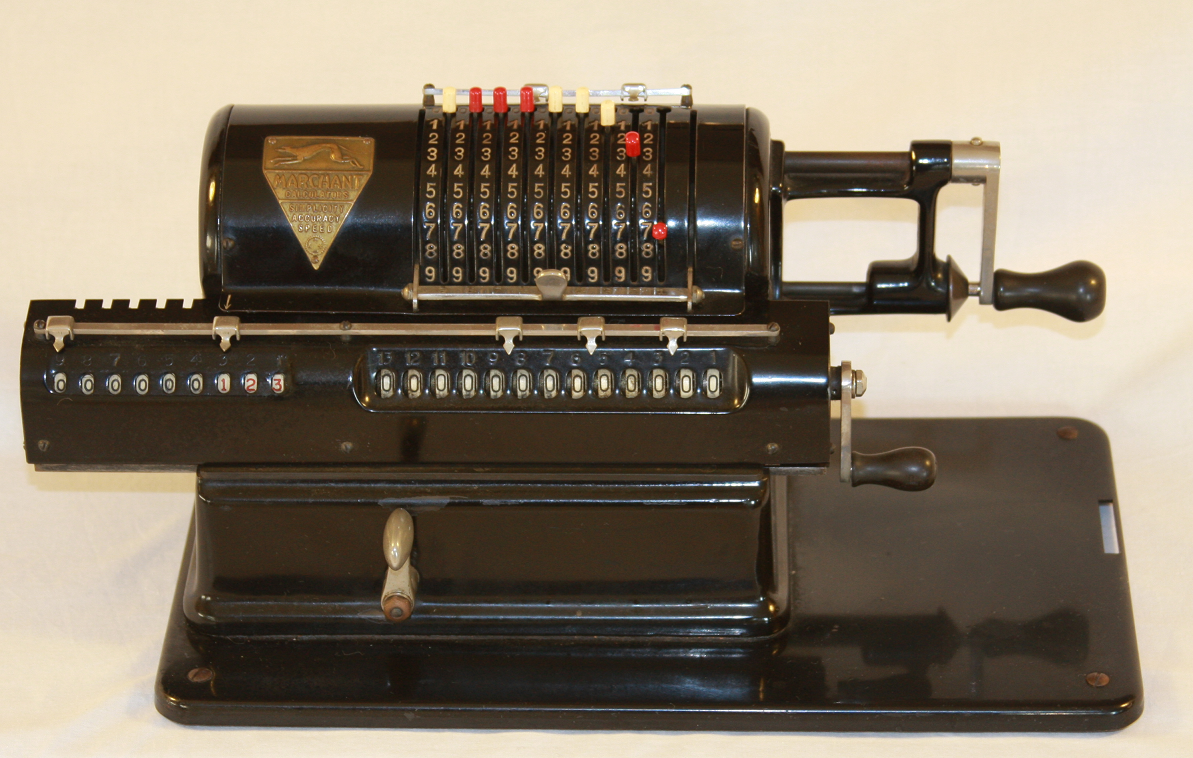
Marchant XLA calculator, based on Friden's design

The Marchant Calculating Machine Company was founded in 1911 by Rodney and Alfred Marchant in Oakland, California.

The company built mechanical, and then electromechanical calculators which had a reputation for reliability. First models were similar to the Odhner arithmometer. In 1918, employee Carl Friden designed a new model in response to patent challenges. It was a great success, and Friden became the chief designer until he left in 1934 to found his own company. In 1958 the company was acquired by the Smith Corona typewriter company in a diversification move that proved unsound; the company, which was now known as SCM, tried to stay competitive by introducing the SCM Cogito 240SR electronic calculator (designed by Manhattan Project veteran Stan Frankel) in 1965. Within a few years a tidal wave of cheaper electronic calculators had devastated their business, and by the mid-1980s, SCM's typewriter business, too, had been ruined by the advent of inexpensive personal computers used as word processors.

== Calculator design ==
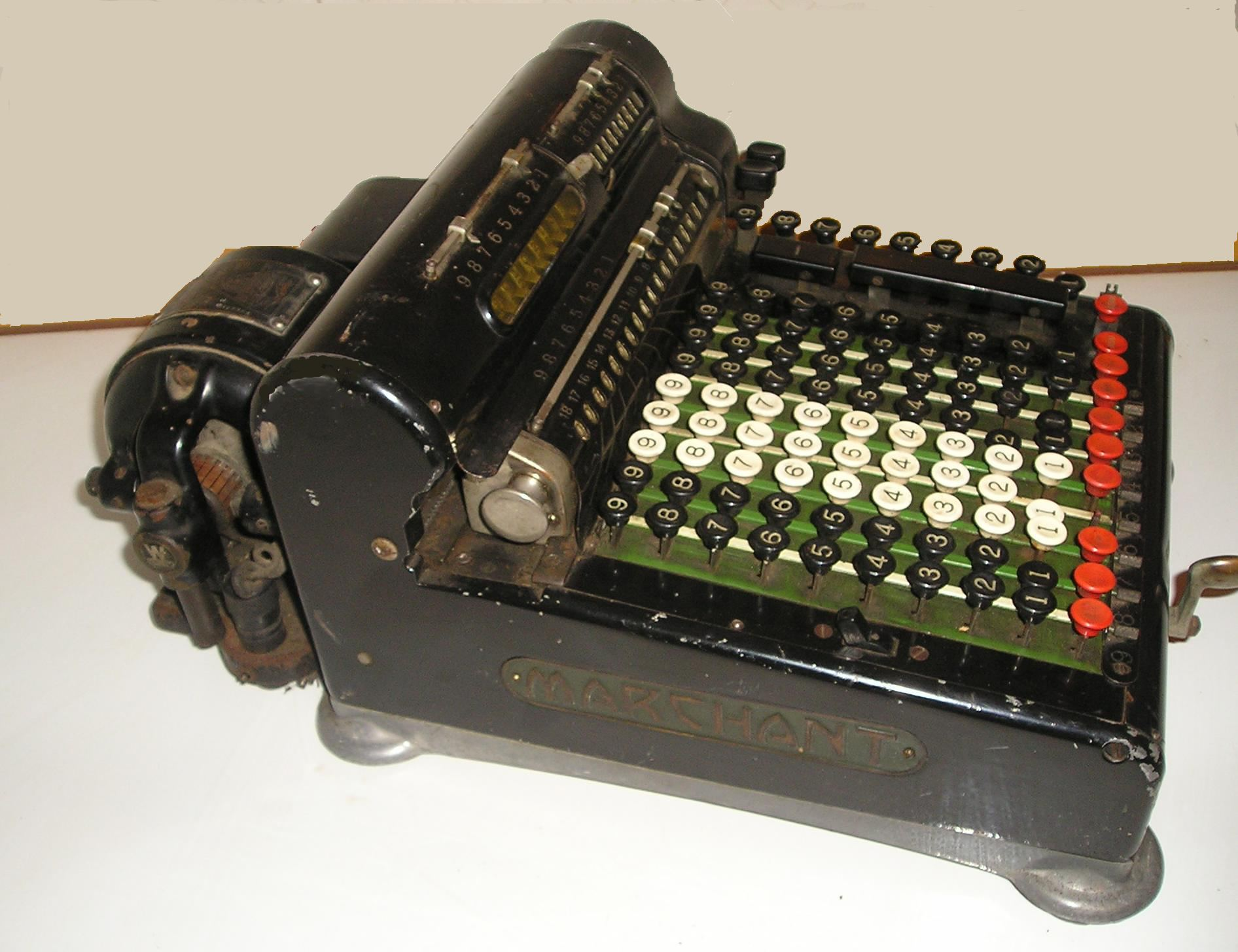
1920s EB-9 Marchant calculator

The first Marchant calculators differed greatly from their later Silent Speed Proportional Gears machines, which were by far the fastest of their type, running at 1,300 cycles per minute. These machines are of considerable technical interest, and are far better known than the earliest ones. Their mechanical design was very unusual in that their result dials (sums, differences, and products) moved at speeds proportional to the digit in the corresponding column of the keyboard. A '1' in the keyboard caused its dial to move the slowest, while a '9', the fastest. Probably the only other such machine was the European Mercedes Euklid, which had a very different (and apparently much simpler) design.

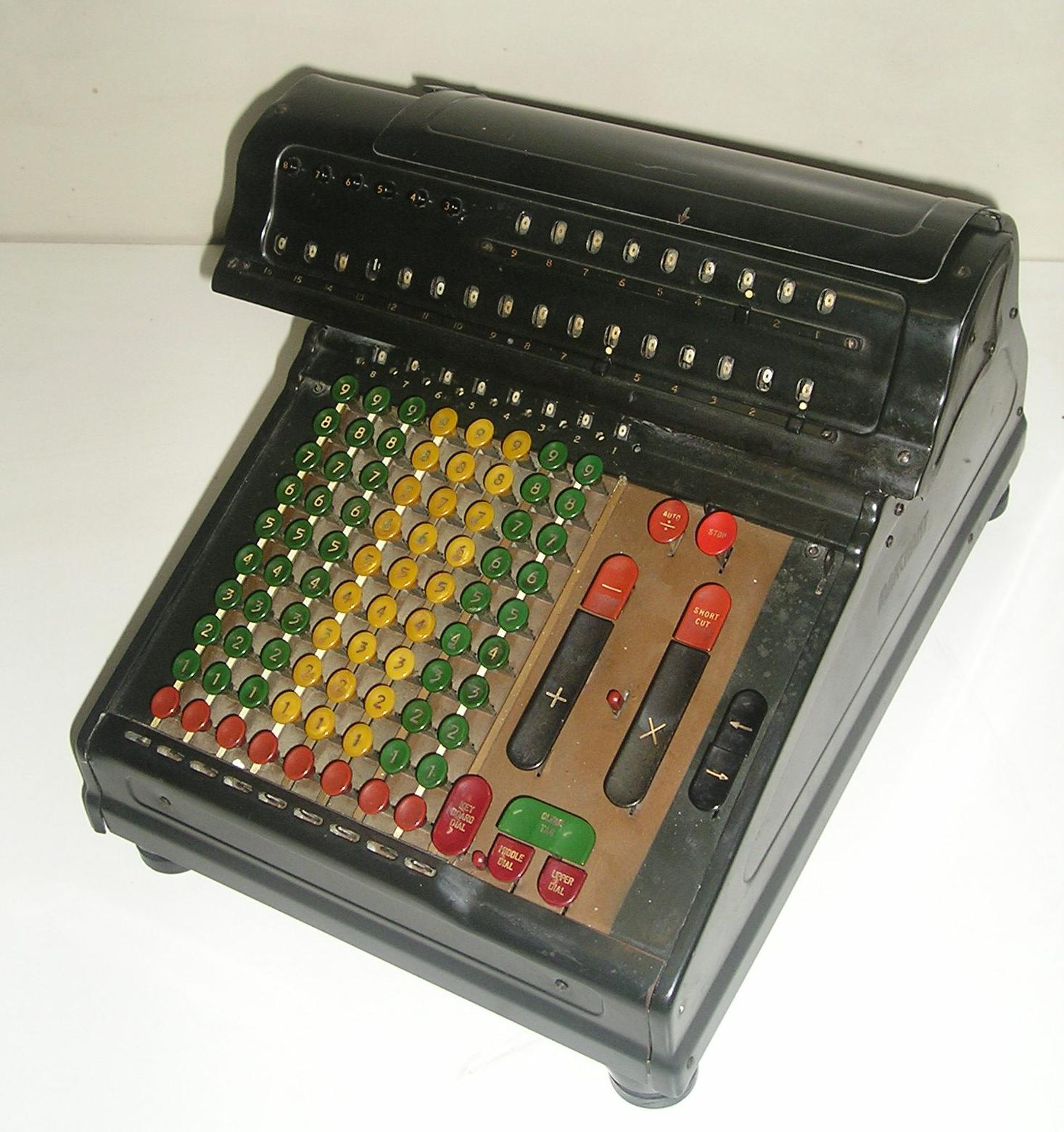
Silent Speed 8D

Carrying to the next higher order was done (effectively) by a 10:1 gear ratio, rather like traditional watthour-meter dials. This was probably unique in a calculator. While running consecutive 'add' cycles to develop a product in multiplication, much of the mechanism was running at constant speeds. All other mechanical calculators had result dials that moved only at one speed, but for different amounts of time, naturally for longer times when larger digits were to be entered. They started quickly, ran at one speed, and stopped quickly. (They also had mechanisms to prevent overshoot (known as coasting) when they stopped.)

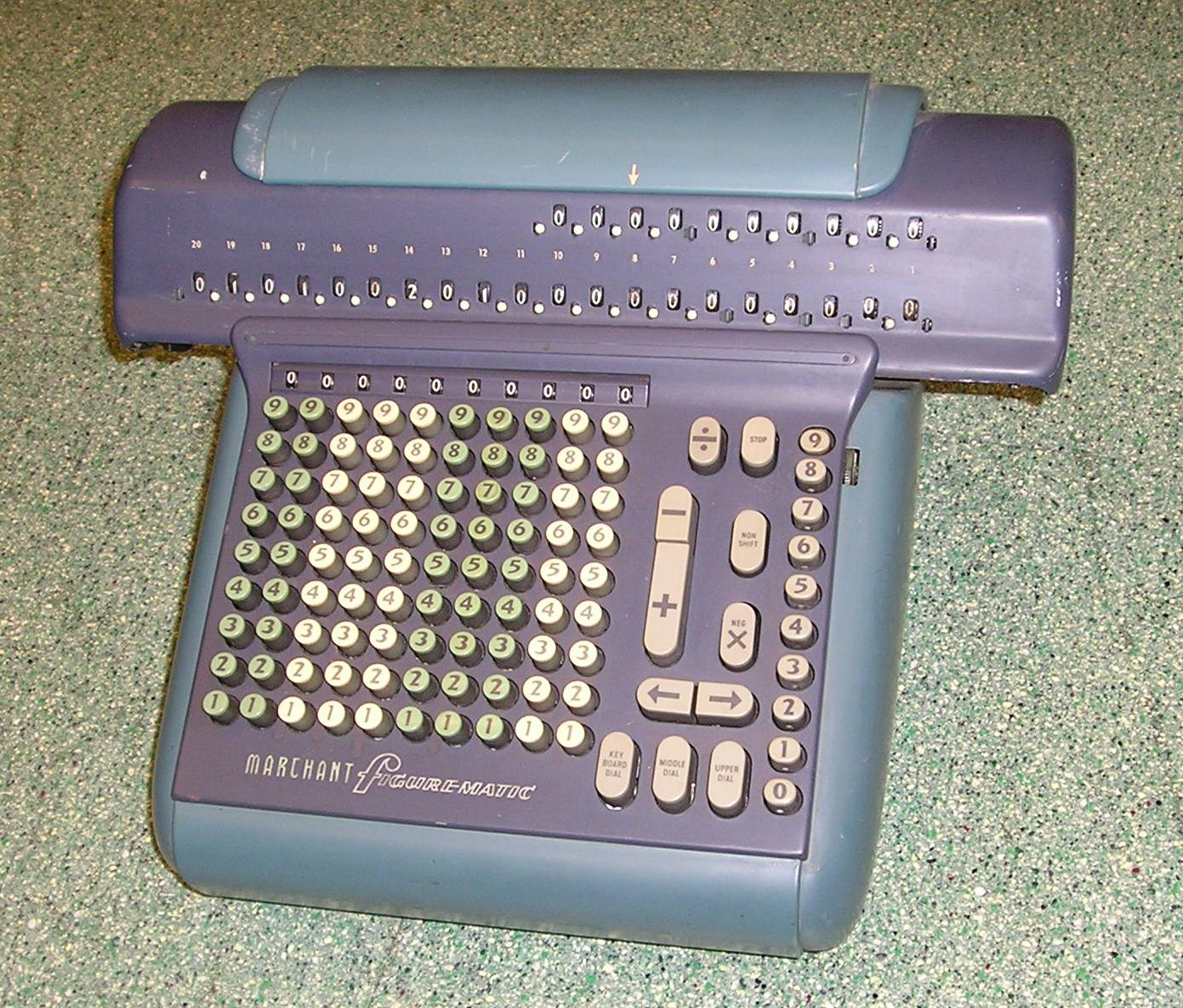
Figurematic (1950-52)

In the Marchant, each column had its own mechanism that might be described as a nine-speed pre-selector transmission. Once engaged, that was what made the dials move at speeds proportional to the digit in that column. This meant that the machine contained, in all, several hundred individual gears.

Carries from lower-order digits came in via one planetary differential per dial. If one held down the + bar, in neighboring columns to the left (with zeros for them in the keyboard), one could see two or maybe three higher-order dials moving at the speeds one would expect.

Watthour meter dials, like the hour hand of a clock, make no attempt to point to the correct digit, if the dial to the right is between, for example, 3 and 7, or so. Such misalignment would be intolerable in a calculator's dials, so each of the Marchant's dials had a constant-lead ("snail") cam attached. Omitting important details, this cam determined the amount of movement needed to realign the result dials. That correction was applied by a second spur-gear differential, again, one per dial.

Some calculators that had been serviced had dials that were mispositioned by (probably) 3.6 degrees; the gears weren't quite meshed correctly when reassembled.

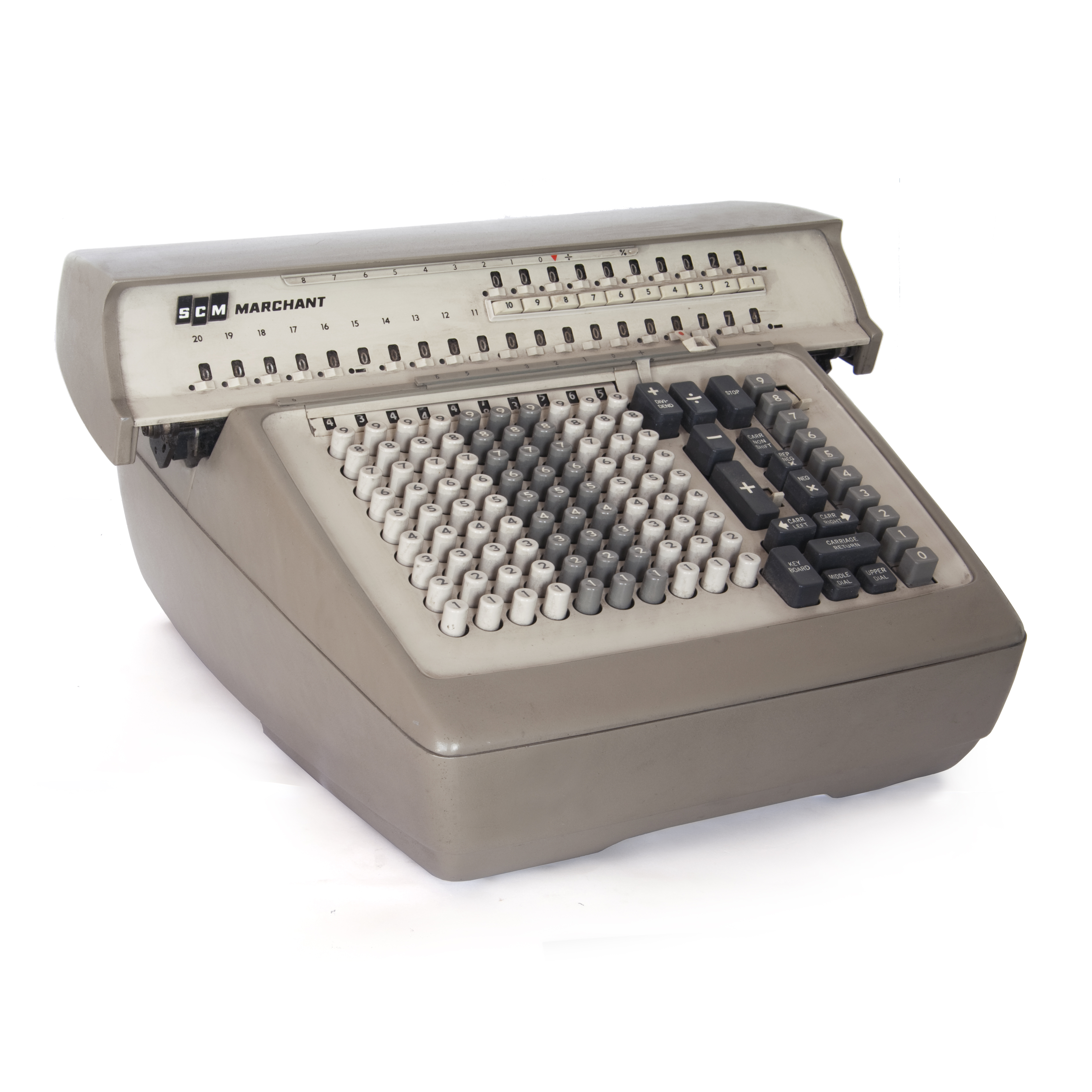
1960s SCM Marchant calculator

The calculator was very complicated compared to, for example the Friden STW, a machine notable for its relative internal simplicity. Much of the Marchant's control mechanism was beneath the keys, and had about 25 "layers" of levers, linkages, latches, and such. It had three driveshafts, extending across the mechanism. Most other calculators had only one.

Most mechanical calculators capable of fully automatic division (and there were many), subtracted until the accumulator went into overdraft ("subtracted one time too many"), then added once to restore the value in the accumulator. The Marchant, however, contained a chain of analog comparators to anticipate the overdraft, and prepare for the next quotient digit.

The Marchant mechanism, internally, differed profoundly in many respects from other makes of calculators of the same general variety. By virtue of sophistication (and complexity), it gained a considerable speed advantage, compared to other designs.
