= Carl Friden =

Swedish American mechanical engineer and entrepreneur (1891–1945)

Carl Friden (April 11, 1891 – April 29, 1945) was a Swedish-born, American mechanical engineer and businessman who founded the Friden Calculating Machine Company (Friden, Inc.).

== Background ==
Carl Mauritz Fredrik Friden was born in Alvesta in Kronoberg County, Sweden. A company biography of Carl Friden from the 1960s or before stated that he was born Carl Bengtsson, but later took Fridén as his surname.

In 1912, he graduated as a mechanical engineer from the Royal Institute of Technology in Stockholm. Friden became a mechanical engineer representing the Swedish Match Trust. In 1913, Friden traveled to in London, England, to assemble match machines for his company. In 1914, he traveled to Australia with the same purpose in mind, but was stranded there when World War I broke out. In the interim he worked on his ideas for designing a more reliable calculator. Two years later he headed to San Francisco on an American steamer to get part way home, but that is where he stayed. He found his place in the Marchant Calculating Machine Co. of Oakland within a year. When the U.S. Government made Marchant discontinue its current model because it violated some German patents, Carl Friden filled the void with his own model.

Friden became the chief designer of the Marchant Calculating Machine Company. While there he introduced his new design which reduced the number of calculator parts by one-third, thus increasing their reliability. Friden continued to develop the modified-pinwheel machines at Marchant during the 1920s. His machines were robust and quickly became popular.

== Friden Calculating Machine Company ==
Carl Friden left the Marchant Calculating Machine Company during the Great Depression in 1934 to establish his own calculator company at San Leandro, California. Four investors came to the firm's aid with funds to add to Carl Friden's limited finances. These investors were Walter S. Johnson and his brother-in-law Charles T. Gruenhagen (1885–1968), both executives with the American Forest Products Corporation, together with their associates, J. B. Lewis of the American Box Company and C. A. Webster of the Stockton Box Company. Both companies were affiliated with American Forest Products Corporation.

Carl Friden already had a number of patents to his credit, including an early calculating machine. Friden's company introduced a calculator that included a square root function in 1952, then went on in 1963 to introduce the model EC-130, a fully transistorized electronic calculator. In 1963 the company was purchased by the Singer Corporation.

== Personal ==
Friden married Hildur Victoria Svenson in 1914 in Stockholm, Sweden. They had two children, Stanley Mauritz Victor Friden (1917) and Barbro Friden. Carl married his second wife Emita Alatorre in 1940 and had two children: Eric Donald Friden (1941) and Linda Marlice Friden (1943). They lived together in Pleasanton, California at their ranch Calmita Acres where they entertained celebrities including Jack London, Ernest Lawrence, Robert Oppenheimer as well as various Scandinavian dignitaries.

Carl Friden was the first president of the Swedish Club of San Francisco and was instrumental in founding the Department of Scandinavian at the University of California, Berkeley. The Order of Vasa was conferred upon Carl Friden by King Gustaf V of Sweden in April 1945 in recognition of his distinguished achievements. He has been described as one of the Bay Area's most prominent Swedish-Americans and is discussed in Muriel Beroza's book Golden Gate Swedes. He was a member of the American Society of Mechanical Engineers, a Lutheran, and a Republican. Carl Friden died of cancer in 1945 and was buried at the Chapel of the Chimes in Oakland, California.

== Related reading ==
- Beroza, Muriel Nelson (2000) Golden Gate Swedes: The Bay Area and Sveadal (Range of Light Works)
