= Caradco =

American window and door manufacturer

Caradco is the oldest manufacturer of wooden windows and sliding glass doors in the United States.

Today part of the JELD-WEN Company, Caradco traces its history back to 1856.

== History ==
The company was founded in Dubuque, Iowa.

For many years it was known as Carr, Adams, and Collier - from which the Caradco name is derived.

Examples of Caradco woodwork can still be found within the White House and other well-known buildings.

The company operated a manufacturing plant in Dubuque for many years until it moved operations out of the area.

== In media ==
Portions of the movie F.I.S.T. were filmed at the former Caradco manufacturing plant.

The plant was outfitted with new windows, which were then smashed on purpose for the film, and the windows were then replaced before the end of filming.
