= Friden, Inc. =

American manufacturer of typewriters, and mechanical and electronic calculators

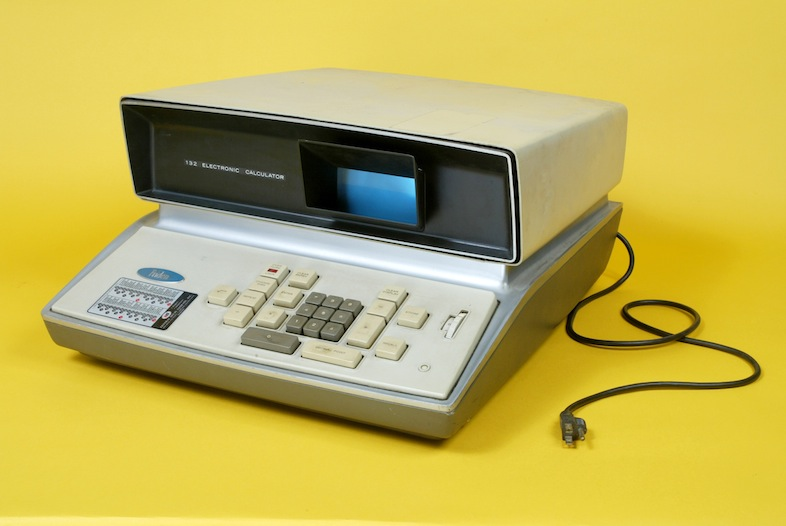
- Friden Model 132 Calculator, 1965
- Type: Private
- Genre: Technology
- Founded: San Leandro, California, U.S.
- Founder: Carl Friden
- Defunct: 1965
- Fate: Acquired
- Successor: Singer Corporation

Friden Calculating Machine Company (Friden, Inc.) was an American manufacturer of typewriters and mechanical, later electronic calculators. It was founded by Carl Friden in San Leandro, California, in 1934.

== History ==
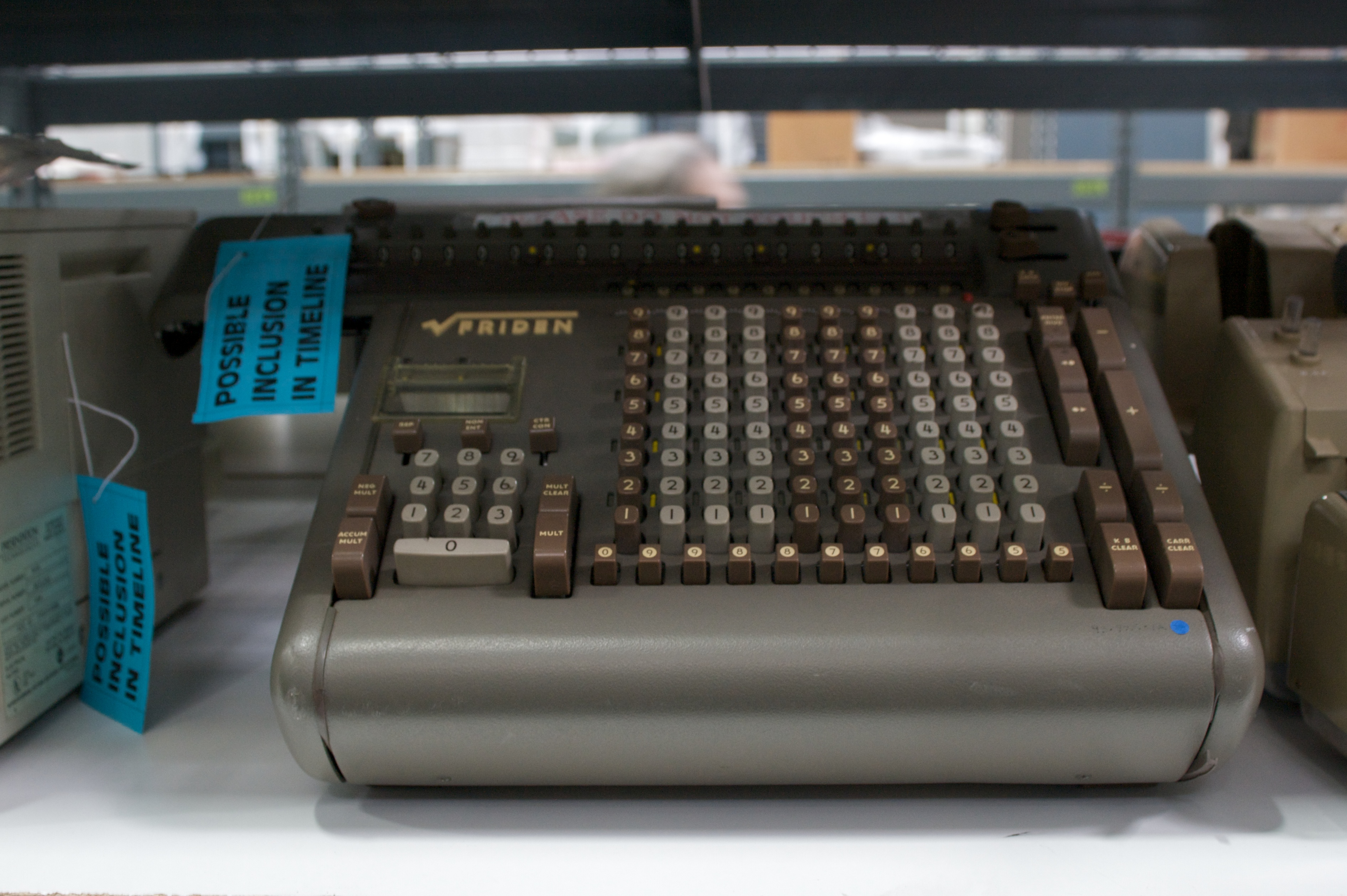
Friden Calculator

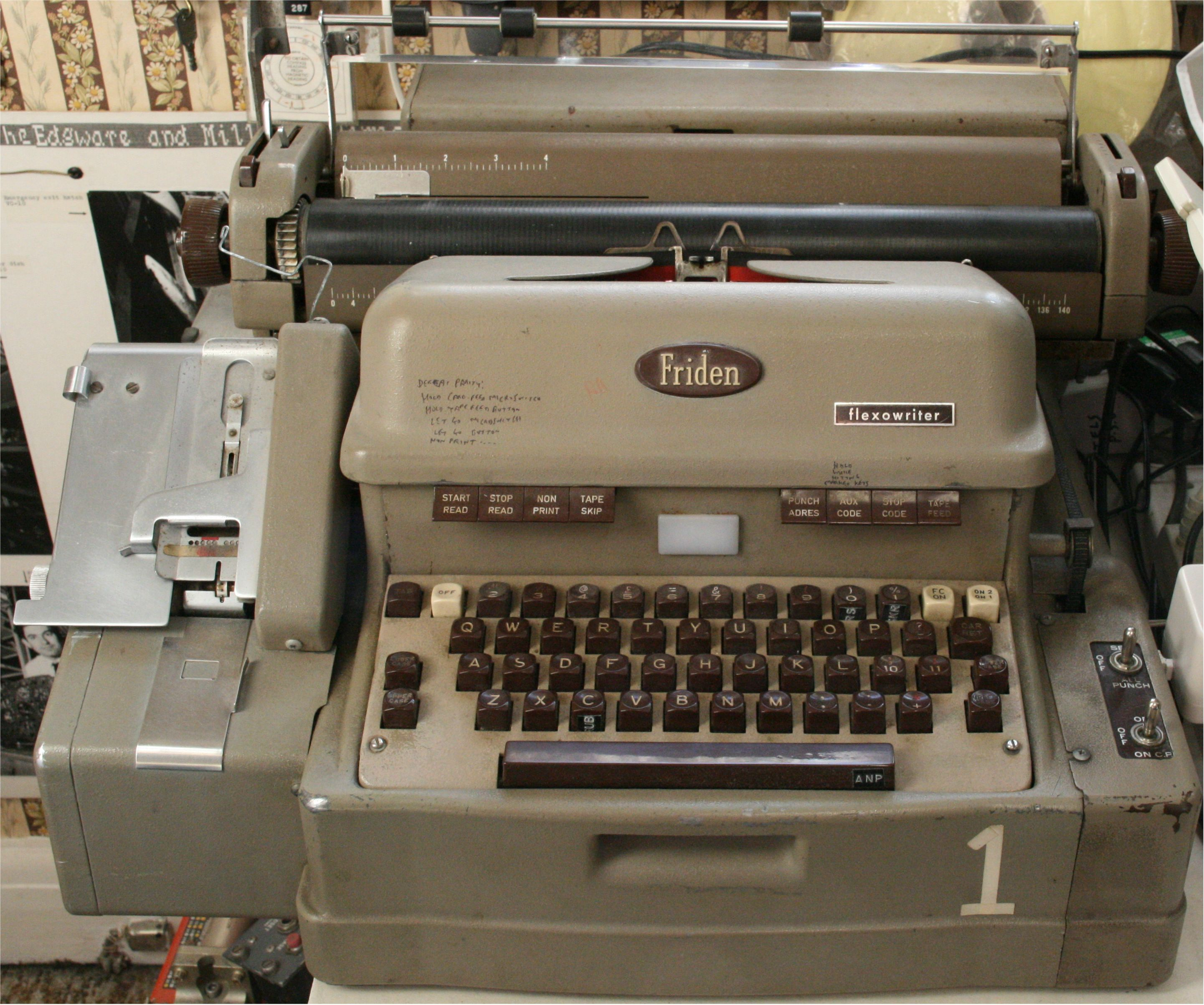
Friden Flexowriter

In 1934 the Friden Calculating Machine Company launched the Friden calculator model A for 8 digit entries and the Friden calculator model B for 10 digit entries. Friden calculator model C had its product launch in 1936 and supported automatic return clearance for the carriage. The Friden calculator model C8 supported 8 digits, while the Friden calculator model C10 supported 10 digits.

In 1957, Friden purchased the Commercial Controls Corporation of Rochester, New York. This gave them the Flexowriter teleprinter, an electric typewriter capable of being used as part of unit record equipment developed in World War II for the Department of the Navy to automatically type "regret to inform you" letters to the survivors of fallen servicemen, the predecessor to modern computers. The Flexowriter could be attached to Friden calculators and driven by paper tape to produce bills and other form letters which had names of customers and amounts of bills filled in automatically. Friden eventually expanded into production of a few models of early transistorized computers.

Friden introduced the first fully transistorized desktop electronic calculator, the model EC-130 in June 1963, designed by Robert "Bob" Appleby Ragen. This machine had a 13-digit capacity and a 5-inch CRT display. It used a magnetostrictive delay-line memory, to save money on expensive transistors. The EC-130 sold for $2,200 (equivalent to $23,100 in 2025), or about three times the price of comparable electromechanical calculators of the time. It was the first calculator to use reverse Polish notation (RPN), which eliminated the need for parentheses to specify the order of operations in complex calculations. The successor model EC-132, introduced in April 1965, added a square root function.

In 1965 the company was purchased by Singer Business Machines, part of Singer Corporation, but continued operation under the Friden brand name until 1974.

The Singer – Friden Research Center in Oakland, California, later moved to Palo Alto, California (1965 to 1970), was unable to develop a pocket-sized calculator to compete with the corresponding new Japanese products, such as the Busicom, based on Intel 4004 in 1971, Casio Mini and Sharp EL-805 in 1972.

== In popular culture ==
An early Friden electromechanical calculator is shown operating in closeup in the 1949 British film The Small Back Room.

Friden calculators, with their hypnotic mechanical movements, populate the hundreds of desks in the office of the imaginary "Consolidated Life" insurance company in the 1960 motion picture The Apartment.

== Bibliography ==
- Comstock, George E. (2003-08-13). "Oral History of George Comstock" (PDF). Interviewed by Hendrie, Gardner. Mountain View, California, USA: Computer History Museum. CHM X2727.2004. Archived (PDF) from the original on 2017-03-23.
