= Slide rule scale =

Graduated markings, generally logarithmic, on slide rule

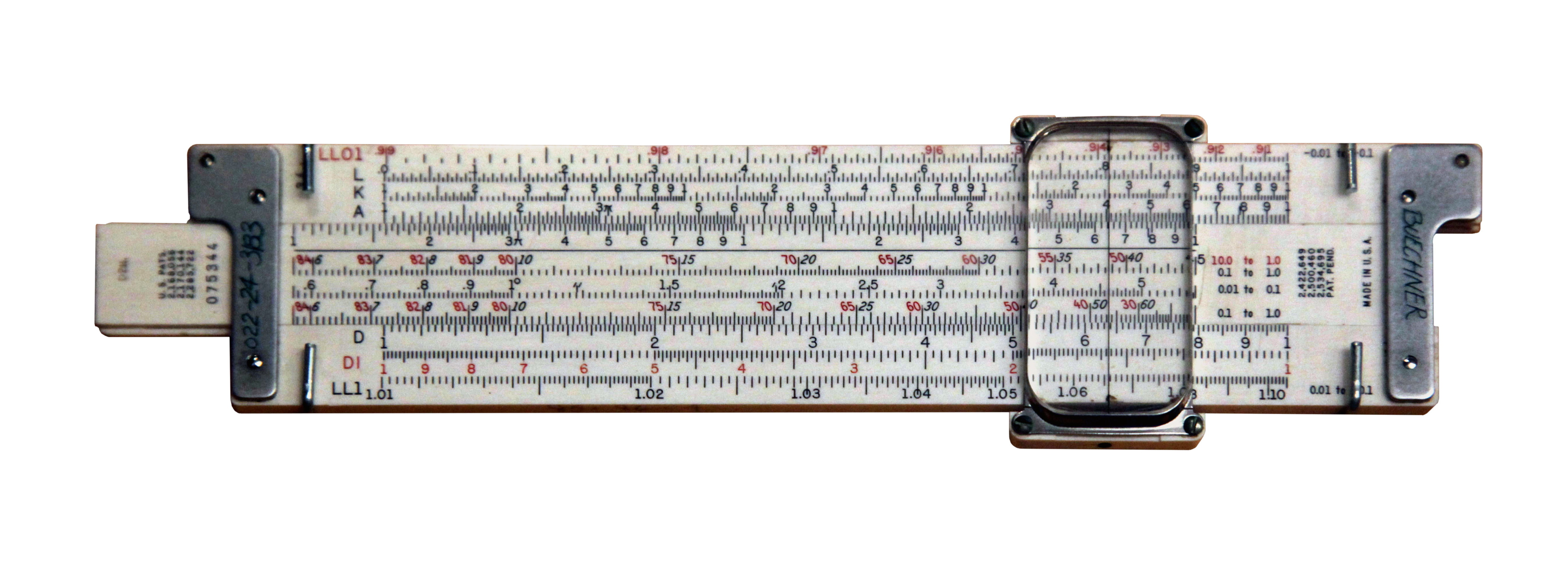
Keuffel and Esser 7" slide rule (5" scale, 1954)

A slide rule scale is a line with graduated markings inscribed along the length of a slide rule used for mathematical calculations. The earliest such device had a single logarithmic scale for performing multiplication and division, but soon an improved technique was developed which involved two such scales sliding alongside each other. Later, multiple scales were provided with the most basic being logarithmic but with others graduated according to the mathematical function required.

Few slide rules have been designed for addition and subtraction, rather the main scales are used for multiplication and division and the other scales are for mathematical calculations involving trigonometric, exponential and, generally, transcendental functions. Before they were superseded by electronic calculators in the 1970s, slide rules were an important type of portable calculating instrument.

== Slide rule design ==
A slide rule consists of a body (Note: The body can also be called frame, base, stock or stator.) and a slider that can be slid along within the body and both of these have numerical scales inscribed on them. On duplex rules the body and/or the slider have scales on the back as well as the front. The slider's scales may be visible from the back or the slider may need to be slid right out and replaced facing the other way round. A cursor (also called runner or glass) containing one (or more) hairlines (Note: A hairline is a very finely drawn line.) may be slid along the whole rule so that corresponding readings, front and back, can be taken from the various scales on the body and slider.

=== History ===
In about 1620, Edmund Gunter introduced what is now known as Gunter's line as one element of the Gunter's sector he invented for mariners. The line, inscribed on wood, was a single logarithmic scale going from 1 to 100. It had no sliding parts but by using a pair of dividers it was possible to multiply and divide numbers. (Note: To multiply two numbers, a and b, a point of the dividers is placed on the 1 marking and the dividers are adjusted so the other point is at a (or a multiple of 10 of a). Keeping the separation of the dividers fixed, one point is moved to b and the second point will indicate axb (or b/a if the second point is placed towards the 1 marking.) The form with a single logarithmic scale eventually developed into such instruments as Fuller's cylindrical slide rule. In about 1622, but not published until 1632, William Oughtred invented linear and circular slide rules which had two logarithmic scales that slid beside each other to perform calculations. In 1654 the linear design was developed into a wooden body within which a slider could be fitted and adjusted.

== Scales ==
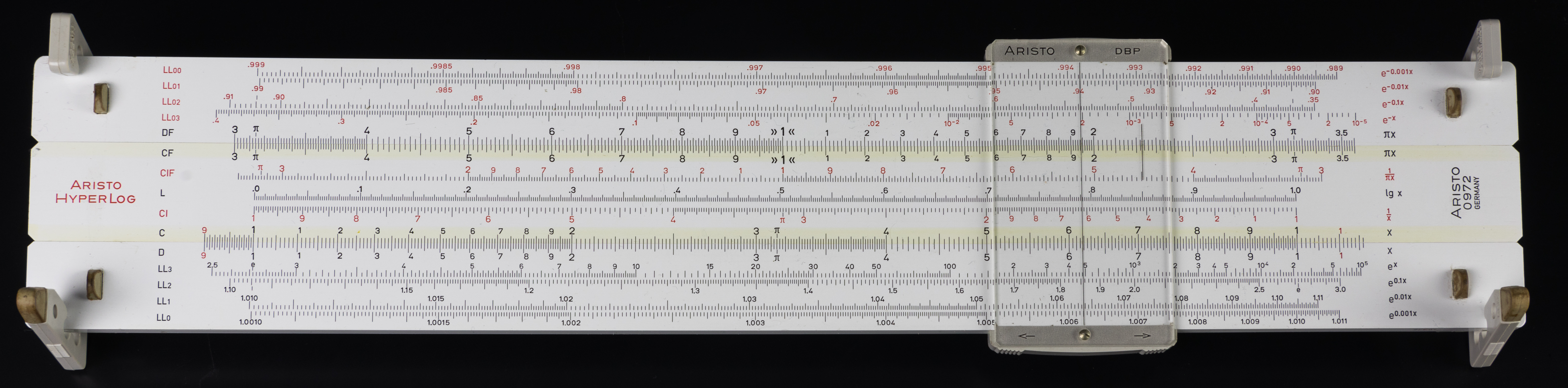
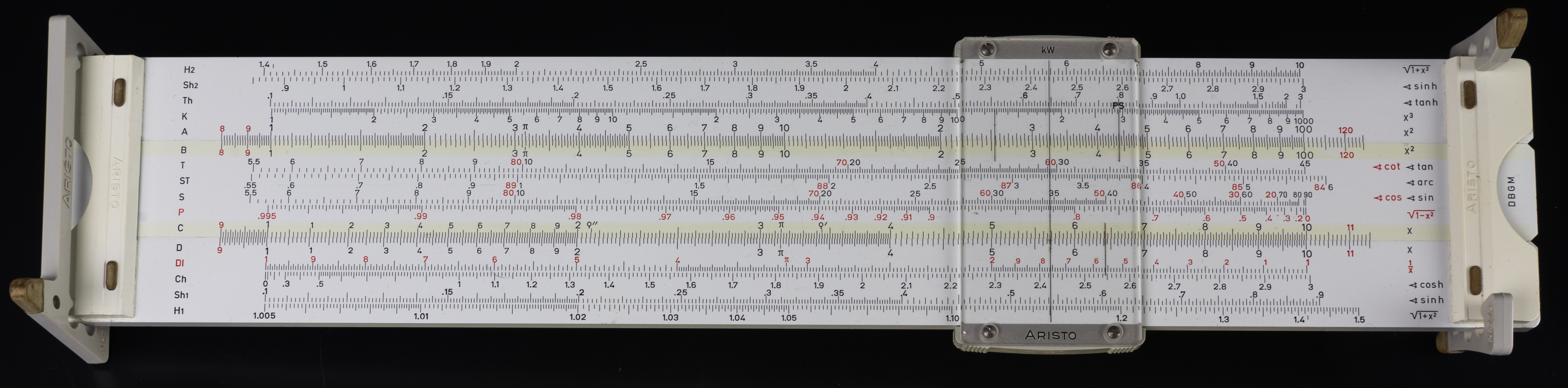
Front and back of Aristo 0972 HyperLog duplex rule (1973)

Simple slide rules will have a C and D scale for multiplication and division, most likely an A and B for squares and square roots, and possibly CI and K for reciprocals and cubes. In the early days of slide rules few scales were provided and no labelling was necessary. However, gradually the number of scales tended to increase. Amédée Mannheim introduced the A, B, C and D labels in 1859 and, after that, manufacturers began to adopt a somewhat standardised, though idiosyncratic, system of labels so the various scales could be quickly identified.

Advanced slide rules have many scales and they are often designed with particular types of user in mind, for example electrical engineers or surveyors. There are rarely scales for addition and subtraction but a workaround is possible. (Note: Note that (u+v)=v⋅(u/v+1) and (u-v)=v⋅(u/v-1) To implement this requires adding or subtracting 1 mentally.) The rule illustrated is an Aristo 0972 HyperLog, which has 31 scales. (Note: The Aristo 0952 HyperLog was being manufactured in 1973 and is 37.4 centimetres (14.7 in) in length overall with scales as follows. Front: LL00, LL01, LL02, LL03, DF (on the slider CF, CIF, L, CI, C) D, LL3, LL2, LL1 and LL00. Back: H2, Sh2, Th, K, A (on the slider B, T, ST, S, P, C) D, DI, Ch, Sh1, H1. Its gauge marks are π, ρ', ρ'', e, 1/e, √2.) The scales in the table below are those appropriate for general mathematical use rather than for specific professions.

Slide rule scales
Label	formula	scale type	range of x	range on scale	numerical range (approx)	Increase / decrease (Note: Whether annotations increase or decrease from left to right.)	comment
C	x	fundamental scale	1 to 10	1 to 10	1 to 10	increase	On slider
D	x	fundamental scale used with C	1 to 10	1 to 10	1 to 10	increase	On body
A	x^{2}	square	1 to 10	1 to 100	1 to 100	increase	On body. Two log cycles at half the scale of C/D. (Note: R1/R2 often easier to use for square root than A and B.)
B	x^{2}	square	1 to 10	1 to 100	1 to 100	increase	On slider. Two log cycles at half the scale of C/D.
CF	x	C folded at π	π to 10π	π to 10π	3.142 to 31.42	increase	On slider
CF_{M}	x	C folded at log_{10}(e)	log_{10}(e) to 10*log_{10}(e)	0.4343 to 4.343	0.4343 to 4.343	increase	On body
CF_{/M}	x	C folded at ln(10)	ln(10) to 10*ln(10)	0.2303 to 2.303	0.2303 to 2.303	increase	On body
Ch	arccosh(x)	hyperbolic cosine	1 to 10	arccosh(1.0) to arccosh(10)	0 to 2.993	increase	On body. Calculating the hyperbolic cosine of hyperbolic angles near 1 with more resolution than using Sh2 and H2 scales.
CI	1/x	reciprocal C	1 to 10	1/0.1 to 1/1.0	10 to 1	decrease	On slider. C scale in reverse direction
DF	x	D folded at π	π to 10π	π to 10π	3.142 to 31.42	increase	On body
DI	1/x	reciprocal D	1 to 10	1/0.1 to 1/1.0	10 to 1	decrease	On body. D scale in reverse direction
K	x^{3}	cube	1 to 10	1 to 10^{3}	1 to 1000	increase	Three cycles at one third the scale of D
L, Lg or M (Note: The Polish firm Skala had an "M" scale used in right triangle solutions.)	log_{10}x	Mantissa of log_{10}	1 to 10	0 to 1.0	0 to 1.0	increase	hence a linear scale
LL0	e^{0.001x}	log-log	1 to 10	e^{0.001} to e^{0.01}	1.001 to 1.010	increase	
LL1	e^{0.01x}	log-log	1 to 10	e^{0.01} to e^{0.1}	1.010 to 1.105	increase	LL1 - LL4 scales are base 10 on some Pickett rules
LL2	e^{0.1x}	log-log	1 to 10	e^{0.1} to e	1.105 to 2.718	increase	
LL3, LL or E	e^{x}	log-log	1 to 10	e to e^{10}	2.718 to 22026	increase	
LL00 or LL/0	e^{-0.001x}	log-log	1 to 10	e^{−0.001} to e^{−0.01}	0.999 to 0.990	decrease	
LL01 or LL/1	e^{-0.01x}	log-log	1 to 10	e^{−0.01} to e^{−0.1}	0.990 to 0.905	decrease	
LL02 or LL/2	e^{-0.1x}	log-log	1 to 10	e^{−0.1} to 1/e	0.905 to 0.368	decrease	
LL03 or LL/3	e^{−x}	log-log	1 to 10	1/e to e^{−10}	0.368 to 0.000045	decrease	
P	√(1-x^{2})	Pythagorean (Note: See Savard for special considerations.)	0.1 to 1.0	√(1-0.1^{2}) to 0	0.995 to 0	decrease	calculating the sine of small angles (ST) or acute angles near 90° (S) via the cosine of the complementary angle
H1	√(1+x^{2})	Hyperbolic	0.1 to 1.0	√(1+0.1^{2}) to √(1+1.0^{2})	1.005 to 1.414	increase	Set x on C or D scale. Calculating the hyperbolic cosine of small hyperbolic angles,
H2	√(1+x^{2})	Hyperbolic	1 to 10	√(1+1^{2}) to √(1+10^{2})	1.414 to 10.05	increase	Set x on C or D scale.
R1, W1 or Sq1	√x	square root	1 to 10	1 to √10	1 to 3.162	increase	for numbers with odd number of digits
R2, W2 or Sq2	√x	square root	10 to 100	√10 to 10	3.162 to 10	increase	for numbers with even number of digits
S	arcsin(x)	sine	0.1 to 1	arcsin(0.1) to arcsin(1.0)	5.74° to 90°	increase and decrease (red)	Also with reverse angles in red for cosine. See S scale in detail image. Note: cos(x)= √(1-sin^{2}(x)) (P)
Sh1	arcsinh(x)	hyperbolic sine	0.1 to 1.0	arcsinh(0.1) to arcsinh(1.0)	0.0998 to 0.881	increase	note: cosh(x)= √(1+sinh^{2}(x)) (H1)
Sh2	arcsinh(x)	hyperbolic sine	1 to 10	arcsinh(1.0) to arcsinh(10)	0.881 to 3.0	increase	note: cosh(x)= √(1+sinh^{2}(x)) (H2)
ST	arcsin(x) and arctan(x)	sine and tan of small angles	0.01 to 0.1	arcsin(0.01) to arcsin(0.1)	0.573° to 5.73°	increase	also arctan of same x values
T, T1 or T3	arctan(x)	tangent	0.1 to 1.0	arctan(0.1) to arctan(1.0)	5.71° to 45°	increase	used with C or D.
T	arctan(x)	tangent	1.0 to 10.0	arctan(1.0) to arctan(10)	45° to 84.3°	increase	Used with CI or DI. Also with reverse angles in red for cotangent.
T2	arctan(x)	tangent	1.0 to 10.0	arctan(1.0) to arctan(10)	45° to 84.3°	increase	used with C or D
Th	arctanh(x)	hyperbolic tangent	1 to <10	arctanh(0.1) to arctanh(1.0)	0.1 to 3.0	increase	used with C or D

=== Notes about table ===
1. Some scales have high values at the left and low on the right. These are marked as "decrease" in the table above. On slide rules these are often inscribed in red rather than black or they may have arrows pointing left along the scale. See P and DI scales in detail image.
2. In slide rule terminology, "folded" means a scale that starts and finishes at values offset from a power of 10. Often folded scales start at π but may be extended lengthways to, say, 3.0 and 35.0. Folded scales with the code subscripted with "M" start and finish at log_{10} e to simplify conversion between base-10 and natural logarithms. When subscripted "/M", they fold at ln(10).
3. For mathematical reasons some scales either stop short of or extend beyond the D = 1 and 10 points. For example, arctanh(x) approaches ∞ (infinity) as x approaches 1, so the scale stops short.
4. In slide rule terminology "log-log" means the scale is logarithmic applied over an inherently logarithmic scale.
5. Slide rule annotation generally ignores powers of 10. However, for some scales, such as log-log, decimal points are relevant and are likely to be marked.

== Gauge marks ==
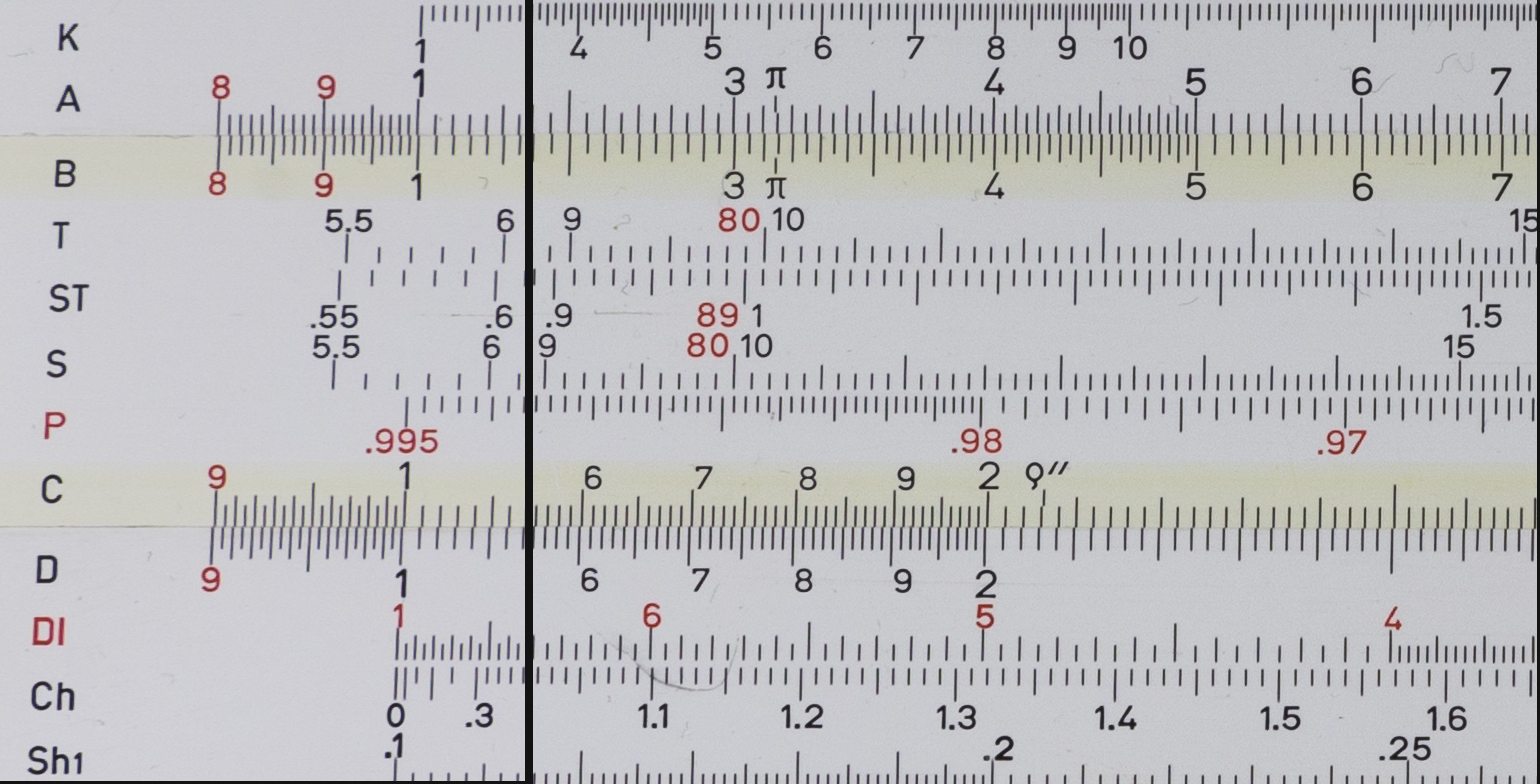
Detail of some scale labels and gauge marks

Gauge marks are often added to the scales either marking important constants (e.g. π at 3.14159) or useful conversion coefficients (e.g. ρ" at 180*60*60/π or 206.3×10^{3} to find sine and tan of small angles). A cursor may have subsidiary hairlines beside the main one. For example, when one is over kilowatts the other indicates horsepower. (Note: See image above of the back of the Aristo slide rule.) See π on the A and B scales and ρ" on the C scale in the detail image. The Aristo 0972 has multiple cursor hairlines on its reverse side, as shown in the image above.

Gauge marks
Symbol	value	function	purpose	comment
e	2.718	Euler's number	exponential functions	base of natural logarithms
π	3.142	π		areas/volumes/circumferences of circles/cylinders
c or C	1.128	√(4/π)		ratio diameter to √(area of circle) (different scales)
C' or C1	3.568	√(40/π)		ratio diameter to √(area of circle) (different scales)
'	0.785	π/4		ratio area of circle to diameter^{2}
' and "	1.97 and 1.18		find trig functions for small angles	On ST/SRT scale only. When aligned with angle minutes or seconds on D scale, C index on D gives sin, tan, or radians
M	0.318	1/π		reciprocal π
ρ, ρ^{0} or 1°	0.0175	π/180	radians per degree	
R	57.29	180/π	degrees per radian	
ρ'	3.438×10^{3}	60x180/π	arc minutes per radian	
ρ"	206.3×10^{3}	60x60x180/π	arc seconds per radian	
c	2.154	$\sqrt[3]{10}$		if no K scale
1n, L or U	2.303	1/log_{10}e	ratio log_{e} to log_{10}	
N	1.341		HP per kW	mechanical horsepower
