= Lucy Julia Hayner =

American Physicist

- Born: 1898; Haynerville, New York
- Died: September 23, 1971 (aged 72–73); New York City
- Education: Barnard College, B.A. 1919; Columbia University, M.A. 1920, Ph.D. 1924
- Spouse: Bernhard Kurrelmeyer
- Scientific career
- Workplaces: General Electric; Columbia University
- Thesis: The Persistence of the Radiation Excited in Mercury Vapor (1924)
- Doctoral advisor: Harold W. Webb

Lucy Julia Hayner (1898 - September 23, 1971) was a physicist, known for inventing a circular slide rule in Braille and for her work in atomic and electron physics.

== Career ==
Hayner was born in 1898 in Haynerville, New York, on a farm which her family had owned since 1742.

Hayner attended Barnard College where she was a student of Margaret Eliza Maltby. She graduated in 1919. She attended graduate school at Columbia University, earning her Master of Arts in 1920 and her Doctor of Philosophy in 1924. She was the fourth woman to earn a Ph.D. in physics from Columbia University. Her dissertation, supervised by Harold W. Webb, was entitled "The Persistence of the Radiation Excited in Mercury Vapor."

Following graduation, she studied at the University of Cambridge under the Barnard Fellowship from 1924 to 1925. Upon her return to the United States, Hayner took up a position as a researcher at General Electric where she assisted Irving Langmuir. She stayed at General Electric from 1925 to 1928 researching electron emission in vacuum tubes.

In 1929 Hayner returned to Columbia University. She taught in the Ernest Kempton Adams Laboratory and specialized in teaching the advanced laboratory class. She later directed the laboratory until her retirement in 1966.

In 1937, Hayner designed and constructed a circular slide rule in Braille. The construction took over 100 hours and the resulting slide rule offered slightly better reading accuracy than the conventional 12-inch straight slide rule in use at the time.

== Personal life ==
Hayner married Bernhard Kurrelmeyer, who was a professor of physics at Brooklyn College. They frequently collaborated on research and published two papers together on the shot effect. Hayner died in 1971 at Doctors Hospital in New York City.

== Publications ==
- Hayner, Lucy J. (September 1925). "The Persistence of the Radiation Excited in Mercury Vapor". Physical Review. 26 (3): 364–375. Bibcode:1925PhRv...26..364H. doi:10.1103/PhysRev.26.364.
- Hayner, Lucy J. (October 1935). "Shot Effects of Secondary Electron Currents". Physics. 6 (10): 323–333. Bibcode:1935Physi...6..323H. doi:10.1063/1.1745273.
- Kurrelmeyer, Bernhard; Hayner, Lucy J. (June 1936). "Electrostatic Capacity Measurements". Review of Scientific Instruments. 7 (6): 233–237. Bibcode:1936RScI....7..233K. doi:10.1063/1.1752135.
- Kurrelmeyer, Bernhard; Hayner, Lucy J. (November 1937). "Shot Effect of Secondary Electrons from Nickel and Beryllium". Physical Review. 52 (9): 952. Bibcode:1937PhRv...52..952K. doi:10.1103/PhysRev.52.952.
