= International Slide Rule Museum =

Museum in Louisville, Colorado, USA

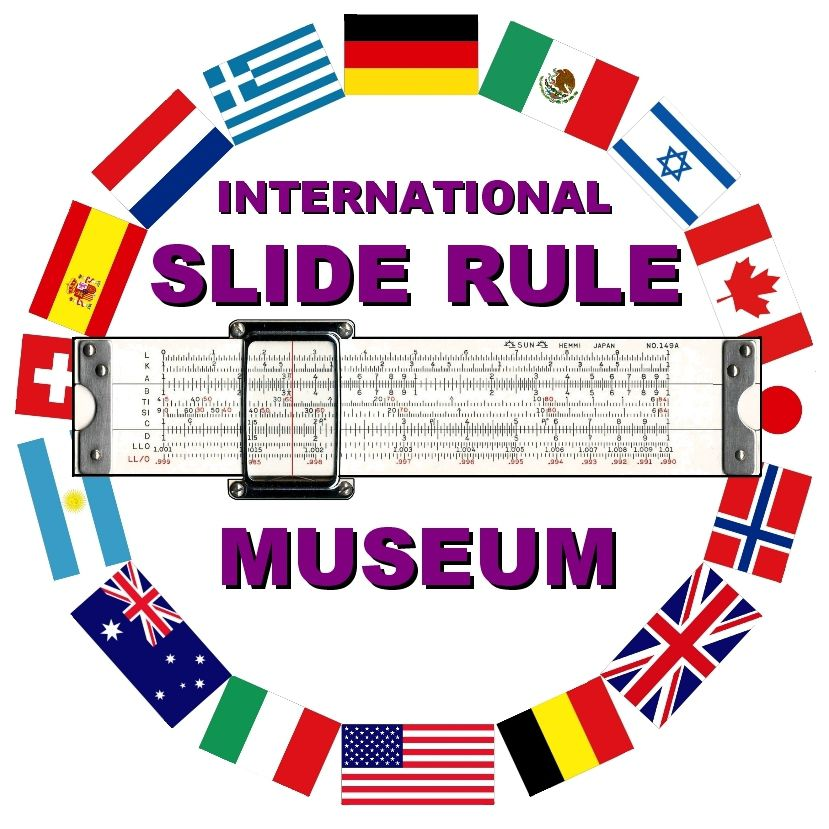
- Established: March 14, 2003; 23 years ago
- Location: 1944 Quail Circle, Louisville, CO 80027; US
- Coordinates: 39°59′22″N 105°8′49″W
- Type: Science and Technology
- Collections: Slide rules Abaci
- Curator: Michael Konshak
- Website: www.sliderulemuseum.com

The International Slide Rule Museum (ISRM) is an American museum dedicated to the preservation and display of slide rules and other mathematical artefacts. Established in 2003 by Michael Konshak, who serves as its curator, the museum houses a collection of slide rules from diverse manufacturers and time periods, showcasing the evolution and importance of these instruments in the history of mathematics and engineering.

It is often identified to be one of the largest repositories of slide rules and logarithmic calculators.

== Key people ==
=== Board of Directors ===
The museum's operations are overseen by its governing body, the Board of Directors, presently composed of nine members. Each member of the Board fulfills a role in the stewardship and guidance of the institution.

Leadership Positions:

- Director and Curator – Michael V. Konshak
- Trustee and Treasurer – Rebecca A. Konshak
- Head of Public Communications, Education, etc. – Marvin Clarence

Advisors:

- Dylan Thinnes
- George Anderson
- Michael Frey
- Michael J. Syphers
- Nathan Zeldes
