= Coggeshall slide rule =

Slide rule designed by Henry Coggeshall

In measurement, the Coggeshall slide rule, also called a carpenter's slide rule, was a slide rule designed by Henry Coggeshall in 1677 to help in measuring the dimensions, surface area, and volume of timber. With his original design and later improvements, Coggeshall's slide rule brought the tool its first practical use outside of mathematical study. It would remain popular for the next few centuries.

The Coggeshall rule consisted of two rulers, each a foot (30 cm) long, which were put together in various ways. The most common and convenient arrangement was to have one of the rulers slide within a groove made along the middle of the other, like an ordinary linear slide rule, as shown in the figure below. Another form had one ruler sliding alongside the other, and a third form had a common two-foot folding ruler with a groove along one side in which a thin sliding piece was inserted that carried Coggeshall's lines.

The most common form of a Coggeshall slide rule

Coggeshall first described this apparatus in a paper he released in London titled, "Timber-measure by a line of more ease, dispatch and exactness, then any other way now in use, by a double scale : after the countrey-measure, by the length and quarter of the circumference in round timber, and by the length and side of the square in squared timber, and square equal in flat timber : as also stone-measure and gauging of vessels by the same near and exact way, likewise a diagonal scale of 100 parts in a quarter of an inch, very easie both to make and use."

After improving the design, he republished his work under the title "A Treatise of Measuring by a Two-foot Rule, which slides to a Foot" (1682). He released a highly modified version in 1722 titled "The Art of Practical Measuring easily performed by a Two-foot Rule which slides to a Foot." By 1767, seven revised editions had been released.
