= Amédée Mannheim =

French mathematician (1831-1906)

Victor Mayer Amédée Mannheim
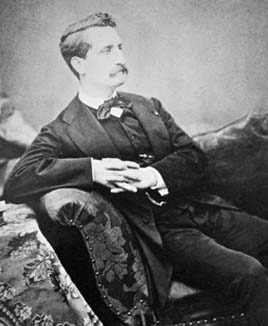
- Born: 17 July 1831; Paris, France
- Died: 11 December 1906 (aged 75); Paris, France
- Known for: Inventing modern slide rule
- Scientific career
- Fields: Mathematics

Victor Mayer Amédée Mannheim (17 July 1831 – 11 December 1906) was the inventor of the modern slide rule. Around 1850, he introduced a new scale system that used a runner to perform calculations. This type of slide rule became known under the name of its inventor: the Mannheim.
