= William Forster (mathematician) =

English mathematician (fl. 1630–1673)

William Forster (fl. 1630–1673) was an English mathematician living in London, a pupil of the celebrated mathematician and astronomer clergyman William Oughtred (1574-1660). He is best known for his book, a translation, compilation and edition of Oughtred's notes, entitled The Circles of Proportion. In it, Forster published Oughtred Circles of Proportion, a logaritmic calculator disc with two cursors, and the Horizontal Instrument, device for astronomical calculations. Forster had persuaded his master to let him translate his notes and rules of use about these two devices, and to publish them. The publication resulted in a controversy, because Richard Delamain the elder, before his publication (1630-32) in which Forster was preparing the book, brought out one treatise on the same subject but with a slide rule substantially different to Oughtred invention (two concentric rings with two logarithmic scales and no cursor) then becoming the first inventor of the slide rule (and getting royal patronage). Delamain also published a second book on his horizontal quadrant, based on Gunter previously published quadrant. He had studied mathematics from Edmund Gunter lectures and chats in his rooms at Gresham College and so, it is not clear what he learned from Oughtred. Forster's work was dedicated to that eminent intellectual, Sir Kenelm Digby (1603-1665), and the account of Oughtred's claim is found in Forster's Preface, or Letter of Dedication. Following the invention or discovery of logarithms by John Napier, in his Mirifici Logarithmorum Canonis Descriptio of 1614, the translation of that work by Edward Wright (1561-1615), and Henry Briggs's Arithmetica Logarithmica of 1624, the logarithmic ruler for navigation invented by Edmund Gunter in 1624, the first with logarithmic scales, the development of the slide rule had an important impact on the engineering activities and little in the mathematics domain, reason why Oughtred did not want anything with them and relied in Forster for publishing the book related with these..

== The Circles of Proportion ==
Forster, of whose life little is known, stated in 1632 that he owed his initiation and whole progress in the mathematical sciences to his worthy friend and teacher, Mr. William Oughtred. Oughtred himself described how he had trained Forster in precepts before letting him become familiar with instruments:

"As I did to Delamain and to some others, so I did to William Forster: I freely gave him my helpe and instruction in these faculties: only this was the difference, I had the very first moulding (as I may say) of this latter: But Delamain was already corrupted with doting upon Instruments, and quite lost from ever being made an Artist: I suffered not William Forster for some time so much as speake of any Instrument, except only the Globe it selfe; and to explicate, and worke the questions of the Sphaere, by the way of the Analemma: which also himselfe did describe for the present occasion. And this my restraint from such pleasing avocations, and holding him to the strictnesse of precept, brought forth this fruit, that in short time, even by his owne skill, he could not onely use any Instrument he should see, but also was able to delineate the like, and devise others: yet for all this my severe hand I saw him obliquely to glaunce his eye upon such Instrumentary practices: whereat I being jealous, lest I should lose my labour, and he his end, which was Art: I brake out into that admonition which in his Epistle Dedicatory to Sir Kenelme Digby he (I thinke in my very formall words) setteth downe."

The indication of Delamain "already corrupted with doting upon instruments" confirms that Delamain had already learned with Edmund Gunter lectures and practical instruments and implies little teaching from Oughtred.

=== Forster's account ===
While staying at Oughtred's residence at Albury, Surrey during the long vacation of 1630, Forster asked him about an instrument he had heard of a ruler of numbers, sines & tangents invented by Gunter. This instrument was to be used with a pair of dividers (a drawing compass). Oughtred told him that that was a poor invention, and difficult to use. "But", said he, "seeing you are taken with such mechanicall wayes of Instruments, I will shew you what devices I haue had by me these many yeares."

He first showed Forster two straight rulers with the same set of logarithmic scales in Gunter's ruler to be used together without the need for compasses, and secondly a circle or ring so marked [with the logarithmic scales], with another moveable circle upon it [having a thread to act as double cursor]. He also showed him an Horizontal Instrument for Astronomical calculations, that could also be used for delineating sundials upon any kind of plane and for demonstrating astronomical principles. Forster was strongly impressed, and told Oughtred he was surprised that he should have kept these valuable inventions hidden for "so many yeares", both from the world, and from himself, to whom his teacher had otherwise been so liberal in explaining the aspects and mysteries of his Art.

=== Oughtred's admonition to Forster ===
Oughtred replied:

"That the true way of Art is not by Instruments, but by Demonstration: and that it is a preposterous course of vulgar Teachers, to begin with Instruments, and not with the Sciences, and so in-stead of Artists, to make their Schollers only doers of tricks, and as it were Iuglers: to the despite of Art, losse of precious time, and betraying of willing and industrious wits, unto ignorance, and idlenesse. That the use of Instruments is indeed excellent, if a man be an Artist: but contemptible, being set and opposed to Art. And lastly, that he meant to commend to me, the skill of Instruments, but first he would have me well instructed in the Sciences."

According to Forster's Letter of Dedication (addressed to Sir Kenelm Digby), Oughtred claimed to have projected the "Horizontal Instrument" about thirty years previously (i.e. around 1600), and showed Forster his many notes and instructions for the use of both instruments, mainly written in Latin. In fact, Oughtred already argued with Edmund Gunter for this device, as Gunter also published about a quadrant. Forster persuaded Oughtred to make them public, and was given the author's permission to compile, translate and publish Oughtred's notes in a book, The Circles of Proportion and the Horizontal Instrument. Both invented, and the uses of both written in Latine by Mr. W. O. Translated into English and set forth for the publique benefit by William Forster (1632, another edition in 1639). Forster never mentioned that Oughtred had a single manuscript but many notes and rules of use.

=== Richard Delamain's claim ===
As per Forster testimony, while he was carefully working on this project (1630-1632), "another to whom the Author in a loving confidence discovered this intent, using more haste than good speed, went about to preocupate [i.e., anticipate]; of which untimely birth, and preventing (if not circumventing) forwardness, I say no more: but advise the studious Reader, only so far to trust, as he shall be sure doth agree to truth and Art." This led to a dispute over the claimed invention, between Forster, Oughtred, and Richard Delamaine the elder, engineer, tutor of the King for mathematics and quartermaster-general.

The anticipatative works were Delamain's Grammelogia, or The Mathematical Ring (printed 1630, dedicated to King Charles I), and his The Making, Description, and Use of a small portable Instrument called a Horizontall Quadrant (printed 1632, dedicated to the Lord Brudenell, Baron of Stonton). According to Oughtred, Delamain was bringing him the printed sheets of his works as they were being prepared, and disregarded Oughtred's criticisms of them. It is clear now that Delamain slide rule invention was substantialy different from Oughtred calculating disc and thus was the first inventor of the slide rule. Also, Oughtred device shown to Forster (with a movable ring and a thread) was also a prototype, as Elias Allen, when told to manufacture it, required the change to integrate a central index with two arms, being this his participation in this second slide rule instrument invention (in 1632).

It was in an address To the courteous and benevolent Reader, prefixed to the two volumes bound together, that Delamain took the bait of Forster's criticism, writing:

"Too great and too loose an aspertion hath bin cast upon me about these things, which I never thought in the least title when I first writ upon this Invention, or my name so to come to the worlds rumor as it hath since the last publication of this Logarythmall projection Circular; howsoever, here is my comfort, the guiltlesnesse and innocency of my cause, which may teach me, and others carefulnesse hereafter, how and what we publish to the world, seeing there are such carpers, and maligners even of the most usefull and best things, yea, such busie bodies who marre that which others make, who scorne to have a second, knowing all things and admiring nothing but themselves, such who have stings like Bees, and Arrowes alwayes ready to shoot against these whom they dislike, such who while they will needs have many callings neglect their owne; sharpe wittie cryticks, Diogenes like, snarling at others, and not looking home unto themselves, but by all meanes endevouring to take away the mantle of peace, and rent the seamelesse coate of love and amitie. If things be not done well by others then they triumph and send forth their invectives, if well, they professe it nothing, and cannot passe without their censure. To speake ill of a man upon knowledge shewes want of Charity; but to raise a scandall upon a bare supposition, and to act it in Print, argueth little humanity, lesse Christianity..."

Oughtred responded at length in his Just Apologie (c. 1634), setting forth his own biography to show his precedence in the matter, and noting "Onely I will soberly tell you that William Forster, whom you call a Parrat speaking he cannot tell what, is a farre more grounded Artist in all parts of the Mathematicks then is R. D: and better knoweth what belongeth to demonstration then R. D. doth: as may soone bee tryed."

== Biographical notices ==
Following the dedicatory epistle to The Circles of Proportion was printed a short notice: "Thos that desire farther instructions in the use of thes Instruments or other parts of the Mathematiques may repaire to W Forster at the Red bull ouer against St Clements Church yard with out Temple bar"; from which it is inferred that he lived and taught mathematics there. The parish of St Clement's lies partly in the City and partly in Westminster: being outside Temple Bar, the sign of the Red Bull was in Westminster.

In 1667 Forster published Forster's Arithmetick, intended for merchants and accountants. It was republished in 1673, with an engraved portrait of the author, This work shows Forster using the Rule of Multiplication based upon the symbol "X", said to have been introduced by Oughtred. A new edition by Henry Coley appeared in 1686; this suggests that Forster died between the publication of the second and third editions.
