= William Oughtred =

English mathematician (1574–1660)

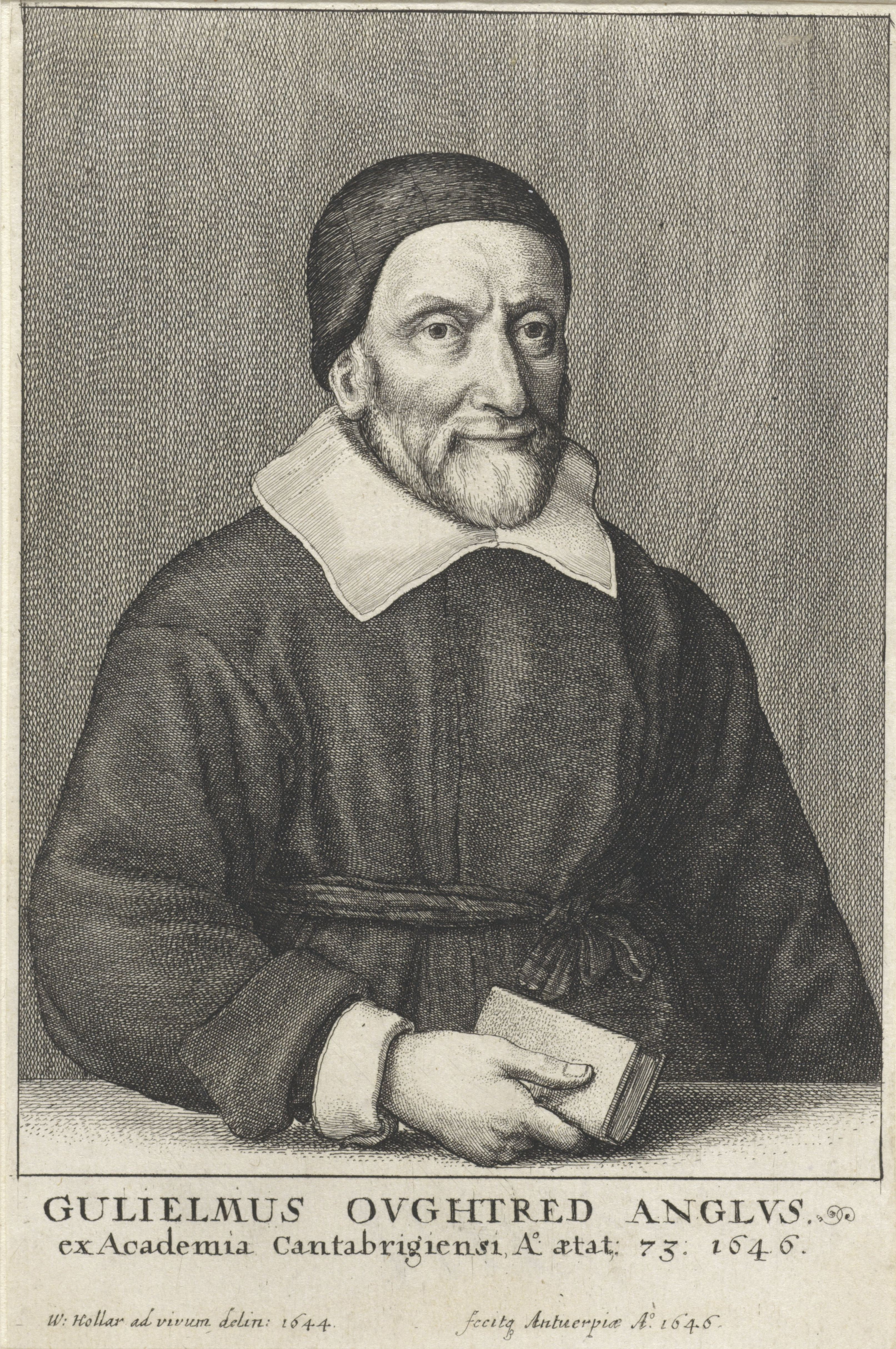
- William Oughtred engraving by Wenceslaus Hollar
- Born: 5 March 1574; Eton, Buckinghamshire, England
- Died: 30 June 1660 (aged 86); Albury, Surrey, England
- Education: Eton College
- Alma mater: King's College, Cambridge
- Known for: Slide rule; Multiplication "×" sign
- Scientific career
- Fields: Mathematician
- Workplaces: King's College, Cambridge
- Notable students: John Wallis; Christopher Wren; Richard Delamain; Seth Ward

William Oughtred (/ˈɔːtərd/ AWT-urd;5 March 1574 – 30 June 1660), also Owtred or Uhtred, was an English mathematician and Anglican clergyman. After John Napier discovered logarithms and Edmund Gunter created the logarithmic scales (lines, or rules) upon which slide rules are based, Oughtred was the first known to use two such scales in separate rods sliding by one another to perform direct multiplication and division. He is credited with inventing the slide rule in about 1622, a priority disputed with Richard Delamain, by which Oughtred's innovation is brought forward to c 1632. He also introduced the "$\times$" symbol for multiplication and the abbreviations "$\sin$" and "$\cos$" for the sine and cosine functions.

== Clerical life ==
=== Education ===
The son of Benjamin Oughtred of Eton in Buckinghamshire (now part of Berkshire), William was born there on 5 March 1574/75 and was educated at Eton College, where his father, a writing-master, was one of his teachers. Oughtred had a passion for mathematics, and often stayed awake at night to learn while others were sleeping. He next attended King's College, Cambridge, where he graduated BA in 1596/97 and MA in 1600, holding a fellowship in the college from 1595 to 1603. He composed a Funeral Ode in Latin for Sir William More of Loseley Park in 1600.

=== Rector at Guildford and at Shalford ===
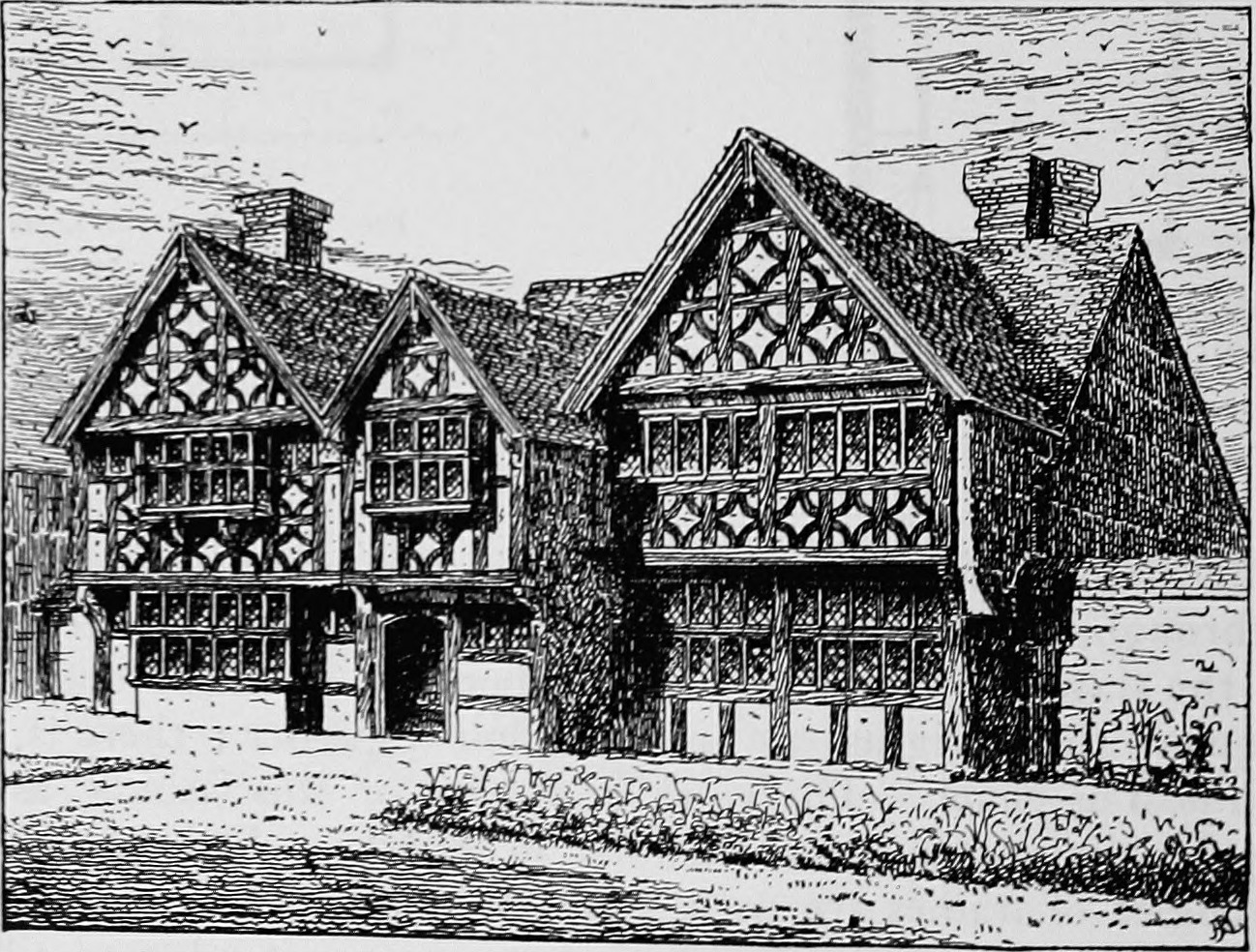
The Caryll home at Great Tangley

Admitted to holy orders, he left the University of Cambridge about 1603, when as "Master" William Oughtred he held the rectorate of St Mary's Church, Guildford, Surrey. At the presentation of the lay patron George Austen, gent., he was instituted as vicar at Shalford near Wonersh, in the neighbourhood of Guildford in western Surrey, on 2 July 1605.

On 20 February 1606, at Shalford, Oughtred married Christs-gift Caryll, a relation of the Caryll family seated at Great Tangley Hall at Shalford. The Oughtreds had twelve children, William, Henry, Henry (the first Henry died as a baby), Benjamin, Simon, Margaret, Judith, Edward, Elizabeth, Anne, George, and John. Two of the sons, Benjamin and John, shared their father's interest in instruments and became watchmakers.

Oughtred's wife was a cousin of Simon Caryll of Tangley and his wife Lady Elizabeth Aungier (married 1607), daughter of Sir Francis Aungier. Oughtred was a witness to Simon Caryll's will, made 1618, and through two further marriages Elizabeth remained matriarch and dowager of Great Tangley until her death in about 1650. Elizabeth's brother Gerald, 2nd Baron Aungier of Longford, was married to Jane, daughter of Sir Edward Onslow of Knowle, Surrey, in 1638. Oughtred praised Gerald (whom he taught) as a man of great piety and learning, skilled in Latin, Greek, Hebrew and other oriental languages.

In January 1610 Sir George More, patron of Compton church adjacent to Loseley Park, granted the advowson (right of presentation of the minister) to Oughtred, when it should next fall vacant, though Oughtred was not thereby empowered to present himself to the living. This was soon after Sir George More became reconciled to the marriage of his daughter Anne to the poet John Donne, which had occurred secretly in 1601.

=== Rector of Albury ===
Oughtred was presented by Sir Edward Randyll of Chilworth (lord of the manor) to the rectory of Albury, near Guildford in Surrey and instituted on 16 October 1610, vacating Shalford on 18 January 1611.

In January 1615/16 Sir George More re-granted the advowson of Compton church (still occupied) in trust to Roger Heath and Simon Caryll, to present Oughtred himself, or any other person whom Oughtred should nominate, when the vacancy should arise. Soon afterwards Oughtred was approached by John Tichborne seeking his own nomination, and entering an agreement to pay him a sum of money upon certain days. Before this could be completed the incumbent died (November 1618), and Oughtred sought for himself to be presented, preaching several times at Compton, having the first fruits sequestered to his use, and, after four months, asking the patron to present him. However, Tichborne offered to complete the agreed payment at once, and was accordingly presented by the trustees in May 1619 (Simon Caryll dying in that year): but before he could be admitted, the Crown interposed a different candidate because the contract between Oughtred and Tichborne was deemed by Sir Henry Yelverton clearly to be Simoniacal.

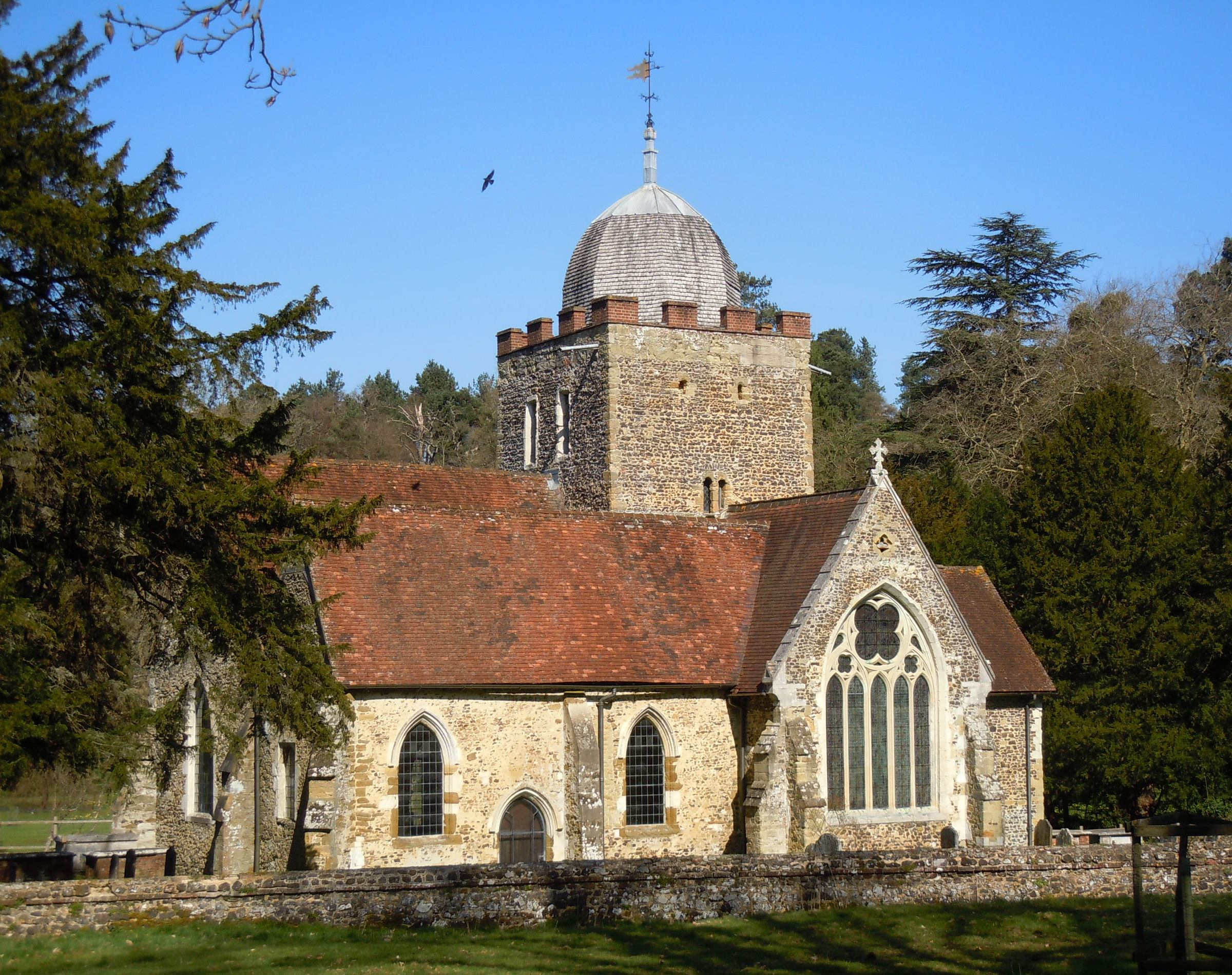
Old St Peter and St Paul's Church, Albury, Surrey, where William Oughtred was rector from 1610 to 1660, and where he is buried.

Oughtred therefore remained at Albury, serving as rector there for fifty years. His patron, the Earl of Arundel, acquired the fine old seat of Albury House through trustees in 1638: title to the manor was assigned in trust for payment of debts to George Duncombe (of Weston in Albury, embedded in the Carrill and Onslow interests), who maintained the manorial courts until his death in 1646, and then to Duncombe's children. The Park and landscapes, which formed the subject of a series of etchings produced by Wenceslas Hollar, c. 1645, were developed in this period, before a parliamentary sequestration which was eventually discharged in 1653. The Earl having died in 1646, and his son and successor Henry (who renewed the assignment) in 1652, it was the grandson Henry Howard (later Duke of Norfolk) who finally paid for and acquired Albury.

William Lilly, that celebrated astrologer, knew Oughtred and claimed in his autobiography to have intervened on his behalf to prevent his ejection from his living by Parliament in 1646:

"About this time, the most famous mathematician of all Europe, Mr. William Oughtred, parson of Aldbury in Surry, was in danger of sequestration by the Committee of or for plundered ministers; (Ambo-dexters they were;) several inconsiderable articles were deposed and sworn against him, material enough to have sequestered him, but that, upon his day of hearing, I applied myself to Sir Bolstrode Whitlock, and all my own old friends, who in such numbers appeared in his behalf, that though the chairman and many other Presbyterian members were stiff against him, yet he was cleared by the major number."

Of his portrait (aged 73, 1646) engraved by Wenceslas Hollar, prefixed to the Clavis Mathematica, John Evelyn remarked that it "extreamly resembles him", and that it showed "that calm and placid Composure, which seemed to proceed from, and be the result of some happy ἕυρησις and Invention". William Oughtred died at Albury in 1660, a month after the restoration of Charles II. A staunch supporter of the royalty, he is said to have died of joy at the knowledge of the return of the King. He was buried in Old St Peter and St Paul's Church, Albury. Autobiographical information is contained in his address "To the English gentrie" in his Just Apologie of c. 1634.

== Mathematician ==
Oughtred developed his interest in mathematics early in life, and devoted whatever spare time his academic studies allowed him to it. Among the short tracts added to the 1647/48 editions of the Clavis Mathematica was one describing a natural and easy way of delineating sun-dials upon any surface, however positioned, which the author states he invented in his 23rd year (1597/98), which is to say, during his fellowship at King's College, Cambridge. His early preoccupation was to find a portable instrument or dial by which to find the hour, he tried various contrivances, but never to his satisfaction. "At last, considering that all manner of questions concerning the first motions were performed most properly by the Globe itself, rectified to the present elevation by the help of a moveable Azimuth; he projected the Globe upon the plane of the Horizon, and applied to it at the center, which was therein the Zenith, an Index with projected degrees, for the moveable Azimuth."

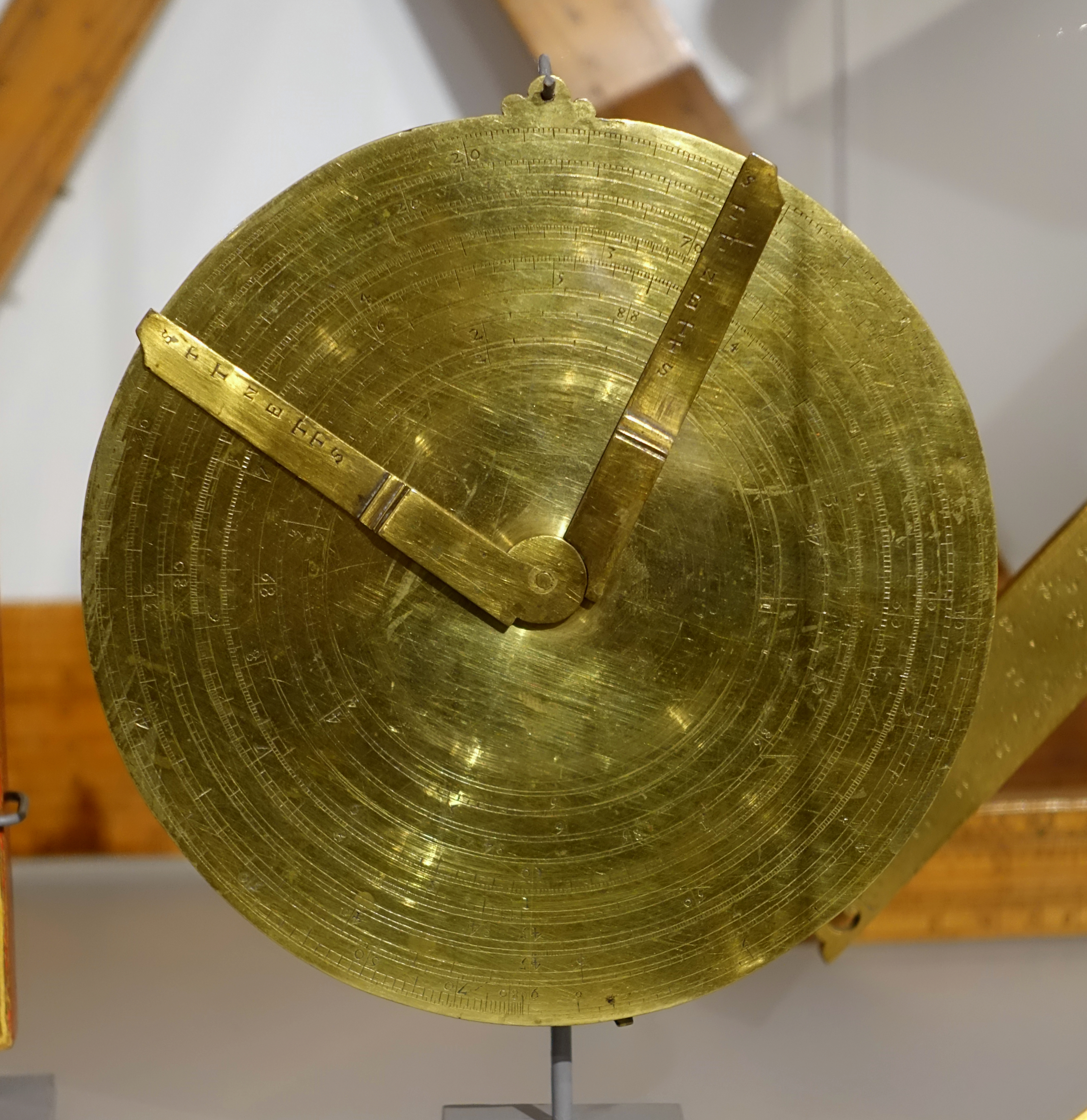
An instrument for Oughtred's "Circles of Proportion", by Elias Allen, c. 1633–1640 (Harvard University, Putnam Gallery)

This projection answered his search, but then he had to invent theorems, problems and methods to calculate sections and intersections of large circles, which he could not find by instruments, not having access to any of sufficient size. In this way he drew out his findings, presenting one example to Bishop Thomas Bilson (who had ordained him), and another, in about 1606, to a certain noble lady, for whom he wrote notes for its use. In London, in spring 1618, Oughtred visited his friend Henry Briggs at Gresham College, and was introduced to Edmund Gunter, Reader in Astronomy, then occupying Dr Brooks's rooms. He showed Gunter his "Horizontall Instrument", who questioned him closely about it and spoke very approvingly. Soon afterwards Gunter sent him a print taken from a brass instrument made by Elias Allen, after Oughtred's written instructions (which Allen preserved). When, in 1632, Richard Delamain the elder claimed that invention for himself, William Robinson wrote to Oughtred: "I cannot but wonder at the indiscretion of Rich. Delamain, who being conscious to himself that he is but the pickpurse of another man's wit, would thus inconsiderately provoke and awake a sleeping lion..."

Around 1628 he was appointed by the Earl of Arundel to instruct his son William Howard in mathematics. Some of Oughtred's mathematical correspondence survives, and is printed in Bayle's General Dictionary, and (with some editorial omissions restored) in Rigaud's Correspondence of Scientific Men. William Alabaster wrote to him in 1633 to propose the quadrature of the circle by consideration of the fourth chapter of the Book of Ezekiel. In 1634 he corresponded with the French architect François Derand, and (among others) with Sir Charles Cavendish (1635), Johannes Banfi Hunyades (1637), William Gascoigne (1640) and Dr John Twysden, M.D. (1650).

Oughtred offered free mathematical tuition to pupils, among them William Forster and Jonas Moore, and his teaching influenced a generation of mathematicians. Seth Ward resided with Oughtred for six months to learn contemporary mathematics, and the physician Charles Scarborough also stayed at Albury: John Wallis and Christopher Wren corresponded with him. Another Albury pupil was Robert Wood, who helped him to see the Clavis through the press. Isaac Newton's high opinion of Oughtred is expressed in his letter of 1694 to Nathaniel Hawes, where he quotes him extensively, calling him "a Man whose judgement (if any man's) may safely be relyed upon... that very good and judicious man, Mr Oughtred".

The first edition of John Wallis's foundational text on infinitesimal calculus, Arithmetica Infinitorum (1656), carries a long letter of dedication to William Oughtred.

== Publications ==
=== Clavis Mathematicæ (1631) ===
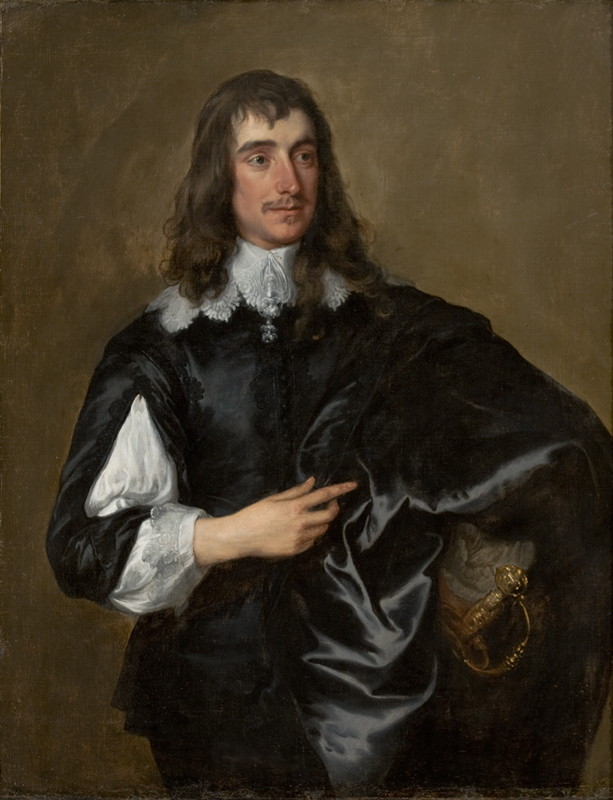
William Howard

William Oughtred's most important work was first published in 1631, in Latin, under the title Arithemeticæ in Numeris et Speciebus Institutio, quae tum Logisticæ, tum Analyticæ, atque adeus totius Mathematicæ quasi Clavis est (i.e. "The Foundation of Arithmetic in Numbers and Kinds, which is as it were the Key of the Logistic, then of the Analytic, and so of the whole Mathematic(s)"). It was dedicated to William Howard, youngest son of Oughtred's patron Thomas Howard, 14th Earl of Arundel.

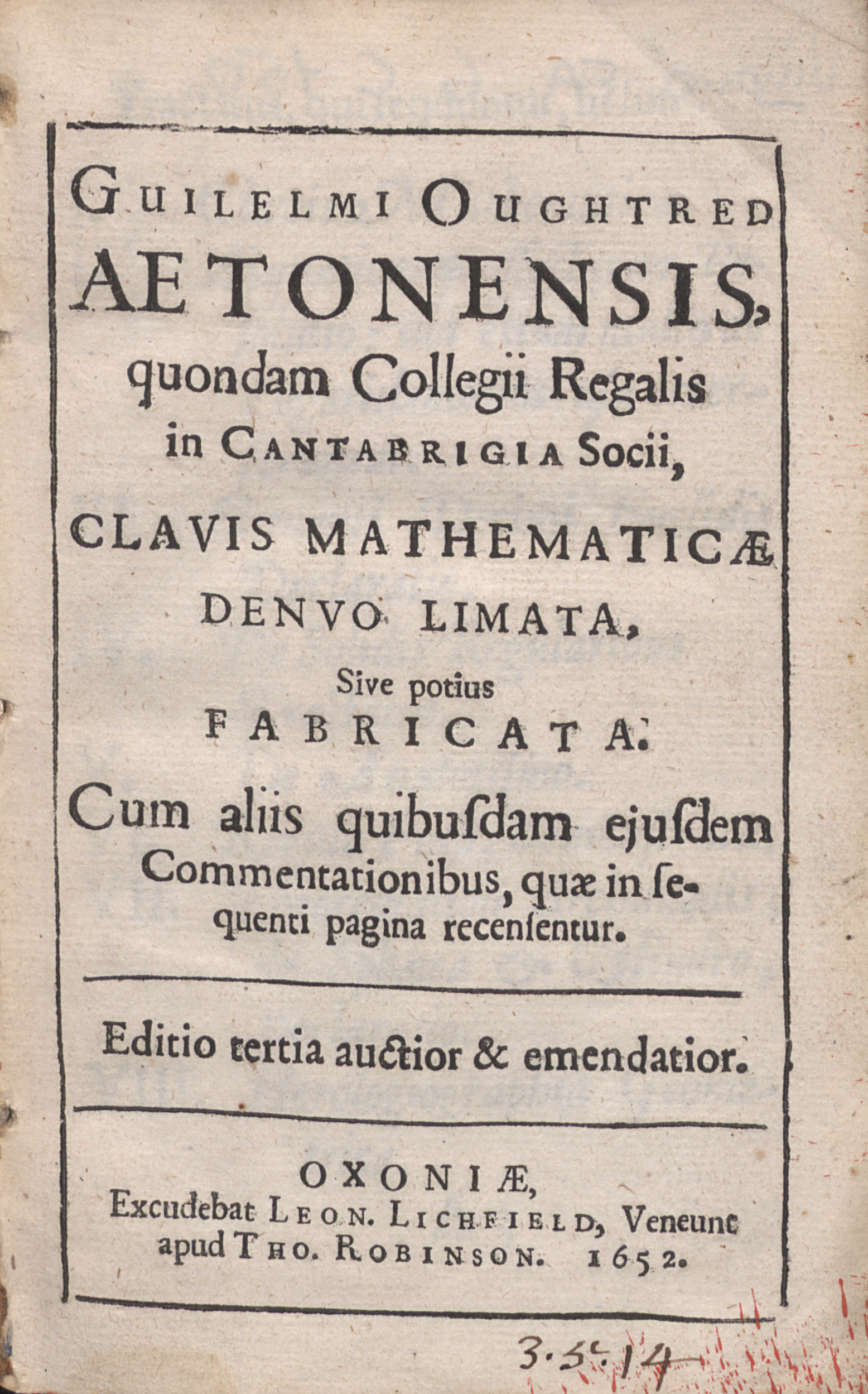
Clavis mathematicae, 1652 edition

This is a textbook on elementary algebra. It begins with a discussion of the Hindu-Arabic notation of decimal fractions and later introduces multiplication and division sign abbreviations of decimal fractions. Oughtred also discussed two ways to perform long division and introduced the "~" symbol, in terms of mathematics, expressing the difference between two variables. Clavis Mathematicae became a classic, reprinted in several editions. It was used as a textbook by John Wallis and Isaac Newton among others. A concise work, it argued for a less verbose style in mathematics, and greater dependence on symbols. Drawing on François Viète (though not explicitly), Oughtred also innovated freely with symbols, introducing not only the multiplication sign as now used universally, but also the proportion sign (double colon ::). The first edition, 1631, contained 20 chapters and 88 pages including algebra and various fundamentals of mathematics.

The work was recast for the New Key, which appeared first in an English edition of 1647, The Key of the Mathematicks New Forged and Filed, dedicated to Sir Richard Onslow and to his son Arthur Onslow (son and grandson of Sir Edward), and then in a Latin edition of 1648, entitled Clavis Mathematica Denuo Limata, sive potius Fabricata (i.e. "The Mathematical Key Newly Filed, or rather Made"), in which the preface was removed and the book was reduced by one chapter. In the English Foreword, Oughtred explains that the intention had always been to provide the ingenious reader with an Ariadne's thread through the intricate labyrinth of these studies, but that his earlier, highly compressed style had been found difficult by some, and was now further elucidated. These editions contained additional tracts on the resolution of adfected equations proposed in numbers, and other materials necessary for the use of decimal parts and logarithms, as well as his work on delineating sundials.

The last lifetime edition (third) was in 1652, and posthumous editions (as Clavis Mathematicæ: i.e. "The Key of Mathematic(s)") appeared in 1667 and 1693 (Latin), and in 1694 (English). The work gained popularity around 15 years after it first appeared, as mathematics took a greater role in higher education. Wallis wrote the introduction to his 1652 edition, and used it to publicise his skill as cryptographer; in another, Oughtred promoted the talents of Wren.

=== The Circles of Proportion and the Horizontal Instrument (1632) ===
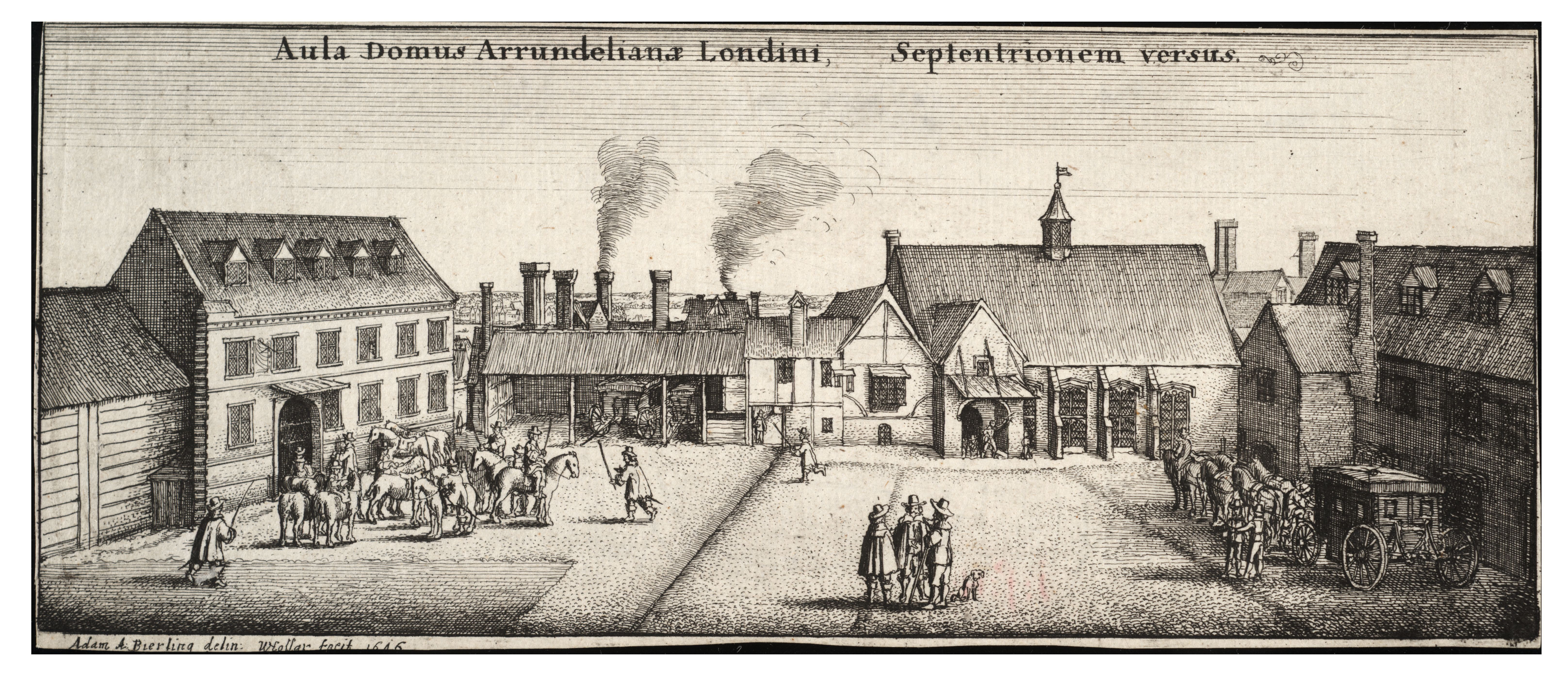

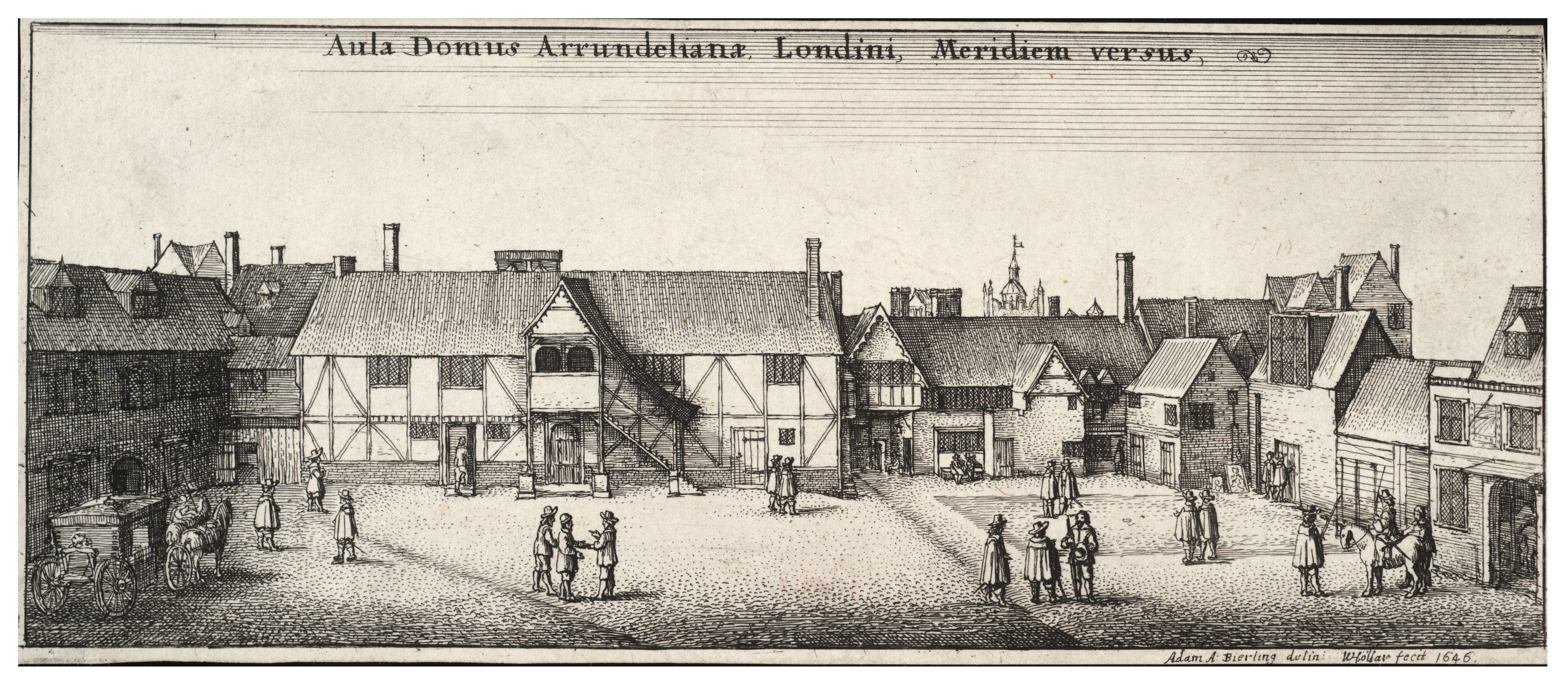
Arundel House, (above), looking south; (below), looking north. By Adam Bierling with Wenceslas Hollar, 1646.

This work was based in many Oughtred notes before it was translated, compiled and edited for publication by his pupil, William Forster. Here Oughtred introduced the abbreviations for trigonometric functions. It contains his description and instructions for the use of his Horizontal Instrument and his Circles of Proportion, a slide rule disc with two cursors, that he invented with the assistance of Elias Allen (master instrument maker), being the second in inventing a slide rule, after the separate invention of Richard Delamain of two rings each with a logarithmic scale and no cursor.

Oughtred with his student, William Forster, and Richard Delamain the elder, are concerned with the story of this book. As instructor to the Earl of Arundel's son, Oughtred had the use of a room in Arundel House, the Earl's residence in the Strand, in London. It is not clear how much instruction he gave there to Richard Delamain (who had already learned mathematics from Edmund Gunter's lectures and chats at his rooms in Gresham College), whom he found to be, like Gunter, too dependent on mathematical instruments to get a proper grasp of the theory behind them. On the other hand, his student William Forster, who came to him as a beginner during the 1620s, was fully taught without reference to instruments so that he should have a true grounding. However, during the long vacation of 1630 Forster (who taught mathematics from a house in St Clement Danes churchyard, on the Westminster side of Temple Bar, in the same locality as Elias Allen's shop), while staying with Oughtred at Albury, asked him about Gunter's Ruler and was shown two hand prototypes prepared by his master, including Oughtred's circular slide rule prototype. This was for him, by then, only a toy.

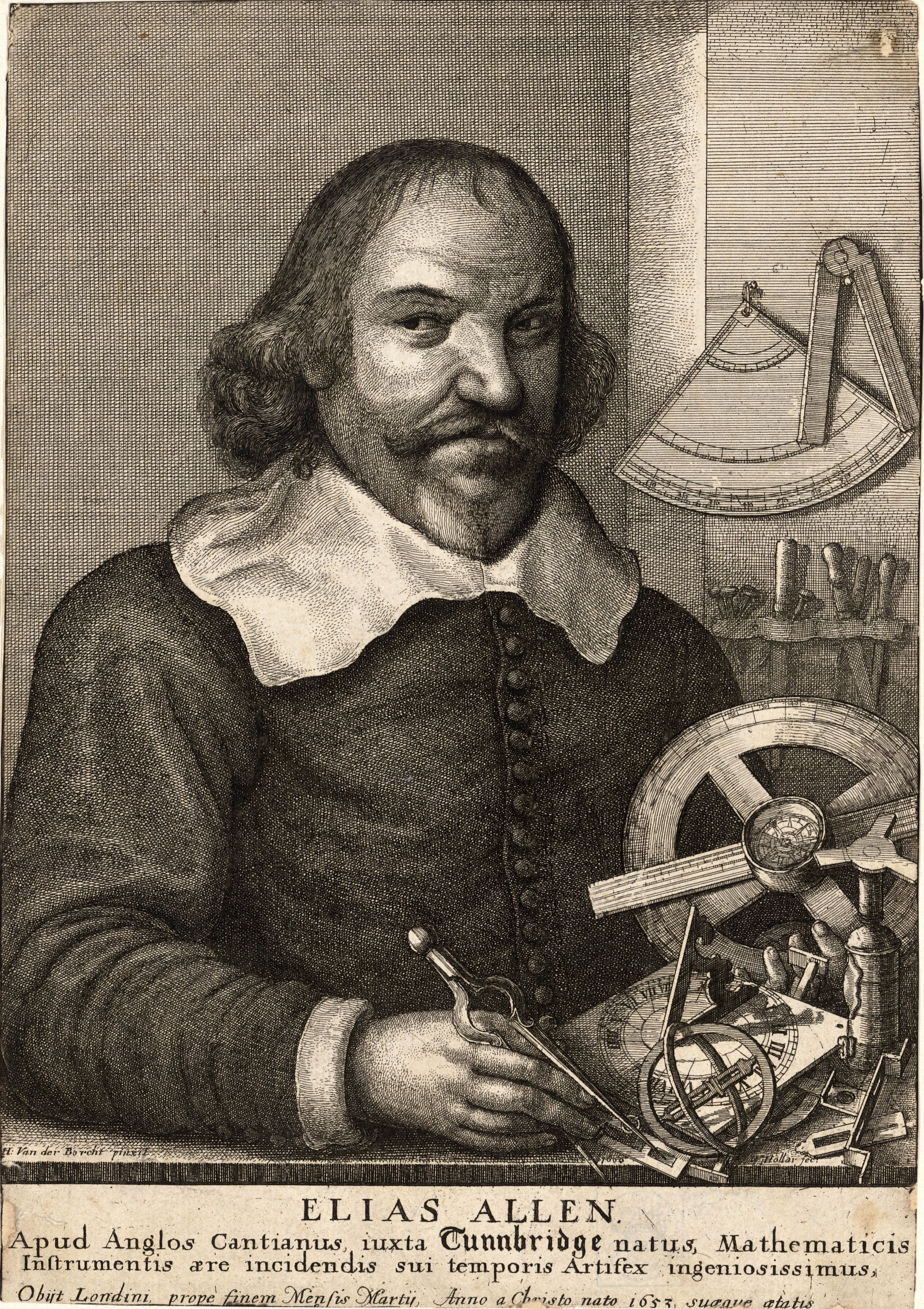
Elias Allen, by Hollar: Oughtred's instrument-maker

Oughtred then said to Forster:

"... the true way of Art is not by Instruments, but by Demonstration: and ... it is a preposterous course of vulgar Teachers, to begin with Instruments, and not with the Sciences, and so in-stead of Artists, to make their Schollers only doers of tricks, and as it were Iuglers: to the despite of Art, losse of precious time, and betraying of willing and industrious wits, unto ignorance, and idlenesse. ... the use of Instruments is indeed excellent, if a man be an Artist: but contemptible, being set and opposed to Art. And lastly, ... he meant to commend to me, the skill of Instruments, but first he would have me well instructed in the Sciences."

Forster, as Oughtred did not want to be involved with such devices, obtained Oughtred's permission to translate, edit and publish the many notes with the descriptions, explanations and instructions in Oughtred's possession of the Circles of Proportion and of the Horizontal Instrument (a device for use in Astronomic calculations), finishing his work in 1632. However, for the final development of the Circles of Proportion as an instrument, he accepted the advice of Elias Allen to employ an index of two arms, instead of the "ring and thread" of his prototype. Previously, Delamain had been writing-up his own description and account of a different instrument and having it manufactured. Delamain came off the press first, with a real instrument made by Elias Allen, being then the inventor of the slide rule, and dedicating the treatise to King Charles I to whom he gave the instrument and from whom he obtained a patent. In his publication preamble, Forster, who dedicated The Circles of Proportion to the famous intellectual Sir Kenelm Digby, remarked that another person had hastily anticipated Oughtred's publication, with other strictures against Delamain, which set a keen dispute in motion. When Delamain responded, in the second edition of his Grammelogia, Oughtred himself published his Just Apologie, setting forth his view of the priority of his own inventions and writings, and deploring Delamain's behaviour.

=== Trigonometria, with Canones Sinuum (1657) ===
Trigonometria, Hoc est, Modus Computandi Triangulorum Latera & Angulos was a collection compiled from Oughtred's papers by Richard Stokes and Arthur Haughton. It contains about 36 pages of writing. Here the abbreviations for the trigonometric functions are explained in further detail consisting of mathematical tables. It carries a frontispiece portrait of Oughtred similar to that by Wenceslas Hollar, but re-engraved by William Faithorne, and depicted as aged 83, and with a short epigram by "R.S." beneath. Longer verses addressed to Oughtred are prefixed by Christopher Wase.

=== Opuscula Mathematica (1677) ===
A miscellaneous collection of his hitherto unpublished mathematical papers (in Latin) was edited and published by his friend Sir Charles Scarborough in 1677. The treatises contained are on these subjects:

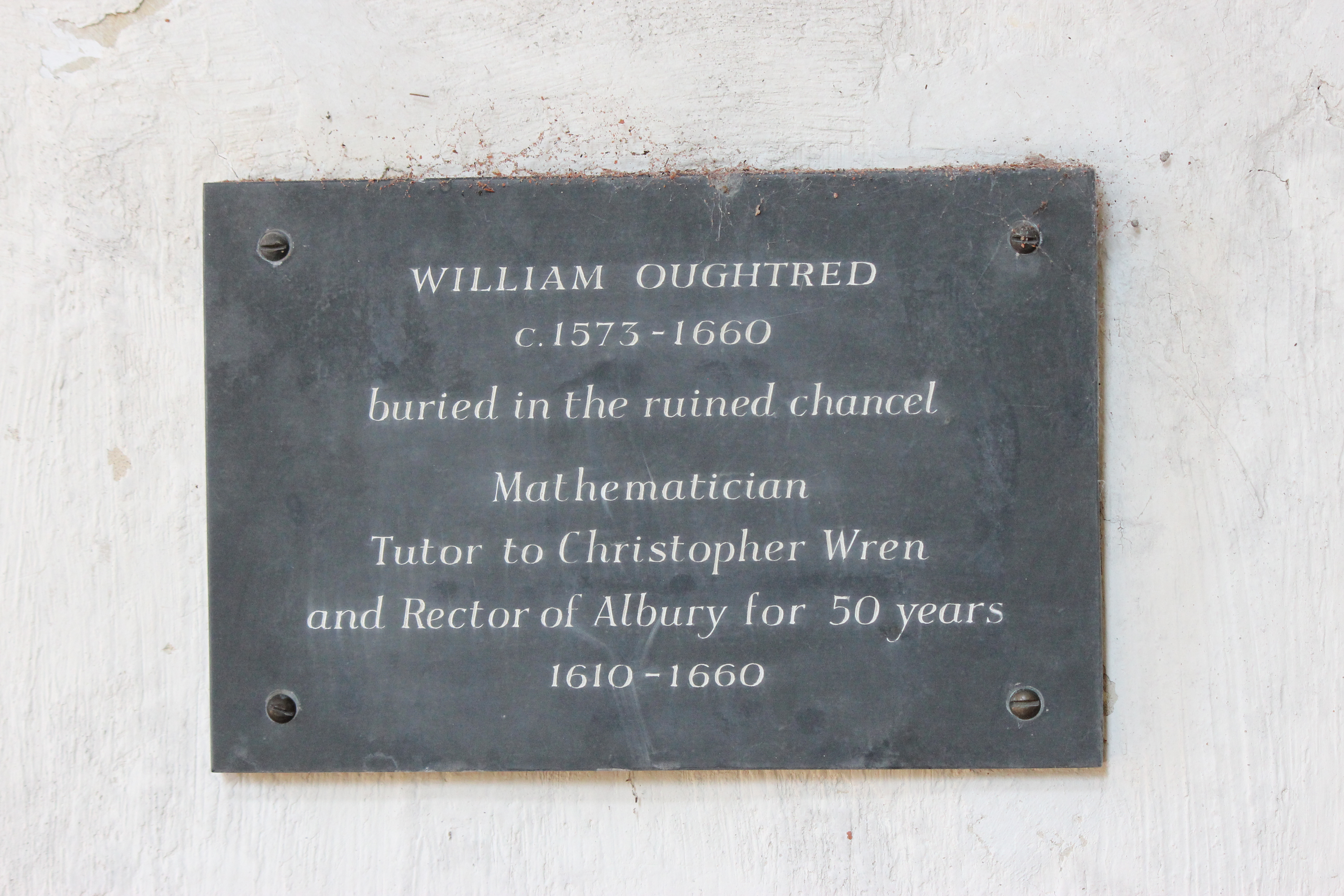
Plaque in the Old St Peter and St Paul's Church, Albury

- Institutiones Mechanicæ.
- De variis corporum generibus gravitate et magnitudine comparatis.
- Automata
- Quæstiones Diophanti Alexandrini Lib. 3
- De Triangulis planis rectangulis
- De Divisione Superficierum
- Musicæ Elementa
- De Propugnaculorum Munitionibus
- Sectiones Angulares

== Inventions ==
=== Slide rule ===
Oughtred's invention of the slide rule consisted of taking a single "rule", already known to Gunter, and simplifying the method of employing it. Gunter required the use of a pair of dividers to lay off distances on his rule; Oughtred made the step of sliding two rules past each other to achieve the same ends. His original design of some time in the 1620s was for a circular slide rule; but he was not the first into print with this idea, which was published by Delamain in 1630. The conventional design of a sliding middle section for a linear rule was an invention of the 1650s.

=== Double horizontal sun dial ===
At the age of 23, Oughtred invented the double horizontal sundial, now named the Oughtred type after him. A short description The description and use of the double Horizontall Dyall (16 pp.) was added to a 1653 edition (in English translation) of the pioneer book on recreational mathematics, Récréations Mathématiques (1624) by Hendrik van Etten, a pseudonym of Jean Leurechon. The translation itself is no longer attributed to Oughtred, but (probably) to Francis Malthus.

=== Universal equinoctial ring dial ===
Oughtred also invented the Universal equinoctial ring dial.

== Occult interests ==
According to his contemporaries, Oughtred had interests in alchemy and astrology. The Hermetic science remained a philosophical touchstone among many reputable scientists of his time, and his student Thomas Henshaw copied a Diary and "Practike" given to him by his teacher. He was well-acquainted with the astrologer William Lilly who, as noted above, helped to prevent his ejection from his living in 1646.

=== John Aubrey: Astrology and Geomancy ===
John Aubrey states that (despite their political differences) Sir Richard Onslow, son of Sir Edward, also defended Oughtred against ejection in 1646. He adds that Oughtred was an astrologer, and successful in the use of natal astrology, and used to say that he did not know why it should be effective, but believed that some "genius" or "spirit" assisted. According to Aubrey, Elias Ashmole possessed the original copy in Oughtred's handwriting of his rational division of the twelve houses of the zodiac. Oughtred penned an approving testimonial, dated 16 October 1659, to the foot of the English abstract of The Cabal of the Twelve Houses Astrological by "Morinus" (Jean-Baptiste Morin) which George Wharton inserted in his Almanac for 1659.

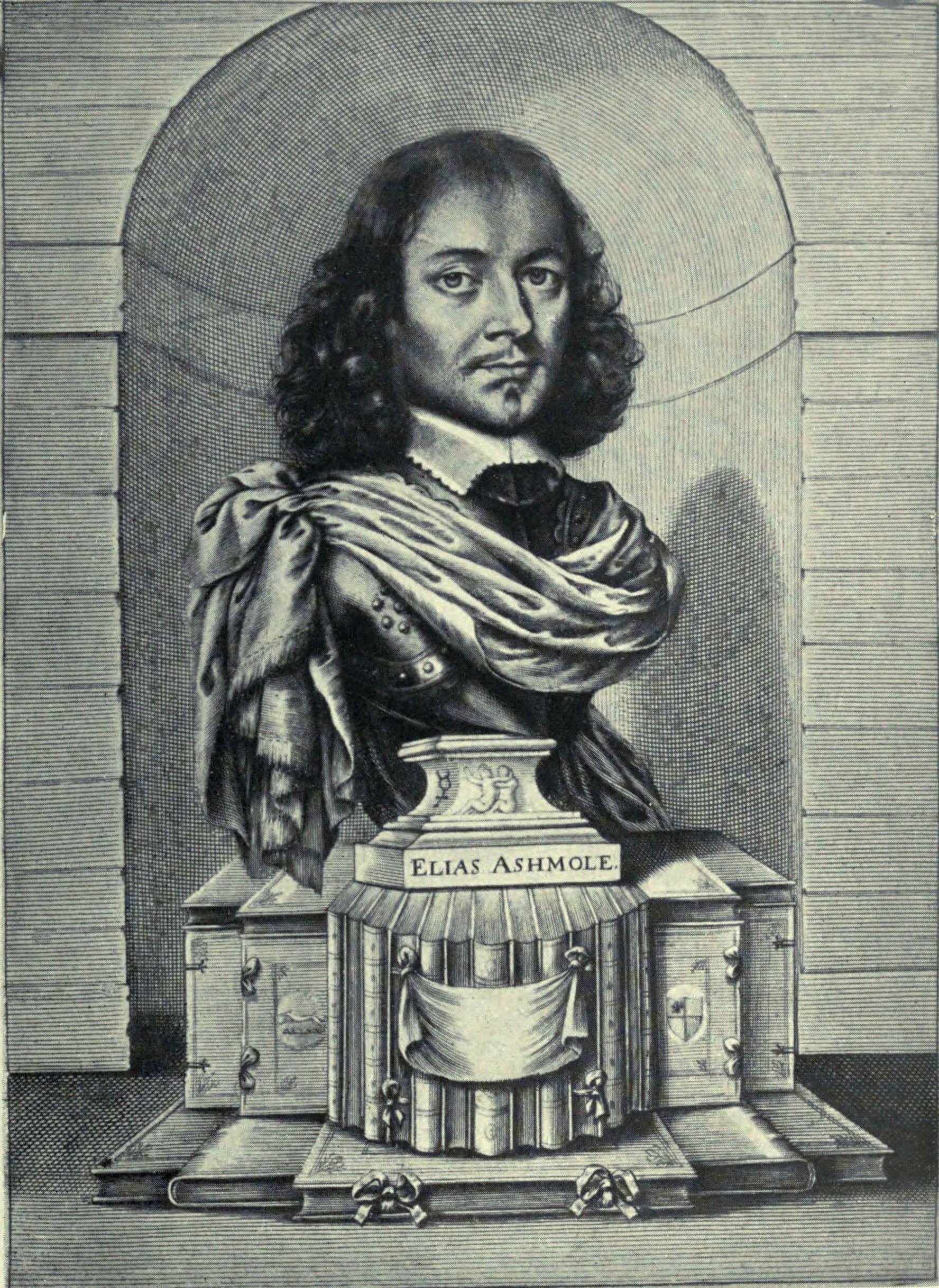
Portrait bust of Elias Ashmole, 1656, by William Faithorne

Aubrey suggests that Oughtred was happy to allow the country people to believe that he was capable of conjuring. Aubrey himself had seen a copy of Christopher Cattan's work on Geomancy annotated by Oughtred. He reported that Oughtred had told Bishop Ward and Elias Ashmole that he had received sudden intuitions or solutions to problems when standing in particular places, or leaning against a particular oak or ash tree, "as if infused by a divine genius", after having pondered those problems unsuccessfully for months or years.

=== Elias Ashmole: Freemasonry ===
Oughtred was well-known to Elias Ashmole, as Ashmole stated in a note to Lilly's autobiographical sketch: "This gentleman I was very well acquainted with, having lived at the house over-against his, at Aldbury in Surrey, three or four years. E.A."

The biography of Ashmole in the Biographia Britannica (1747) called forth the supposition that Oughtred was a participant in Ashmole's admission to freemasonry in 1646. Friedrich Nicolai, in both sections of his Essay (on the Templar and Masonic Orders) of 1783, associated Oughtred, Lilly, Wharton and other Astrologers in the formation of the order of Free and Accepted Masons in Warrington and London. The statement was reinforced through repetition by Thomas De Quincey, and elaborated by Jean-Marie Ragon, but was debunked in A.G. Mackey's History of Freemasonry (1906).

Ashmole noted that he paid a visit to "Mr. Oughtred, the famous mathematician", on 15 September 1654, about three weeks after the Astrologers' Feast of that year.

=== John Evelyn: Millenarianism ===
Oughtred expressed millenarian views to John Evelyn in 1655:

"Came that renowned mathematician, Mr. Oughtred, to see me, I sending my coach to bring him to Wotton, being now very aged. Among other discourse, he told me he thought water to be the philosopher's first matter, and that he was well persuaded of the possibility of their elixir; he believed the sun to be a material fire, the moon a continent, as appears by the late selenographers; he had strong apprehensions of some significant event to happen the following year, from the calculation of difference with the diluvian period; and added that it might possibly be to convert the Jews by our Saviour's visible appearance, or to judge the world; and therefore, his word was, Parate in occursum; he said Original Sin was not met with in the Greek Fathers, yet he believed the thing; this was from some discourse on Dr. Taylor's late book, which I had lent him."

== Oughtred Society ==
Oughtred's name is remembered in the Oughtred Society, a group formed in the United States in 1991 for collectors of slide rules. It produces the twice-yearly Journal of the Oughtred Society and holds meetings and auctions for its members.
