= Link (unit) =

Unit of length

link
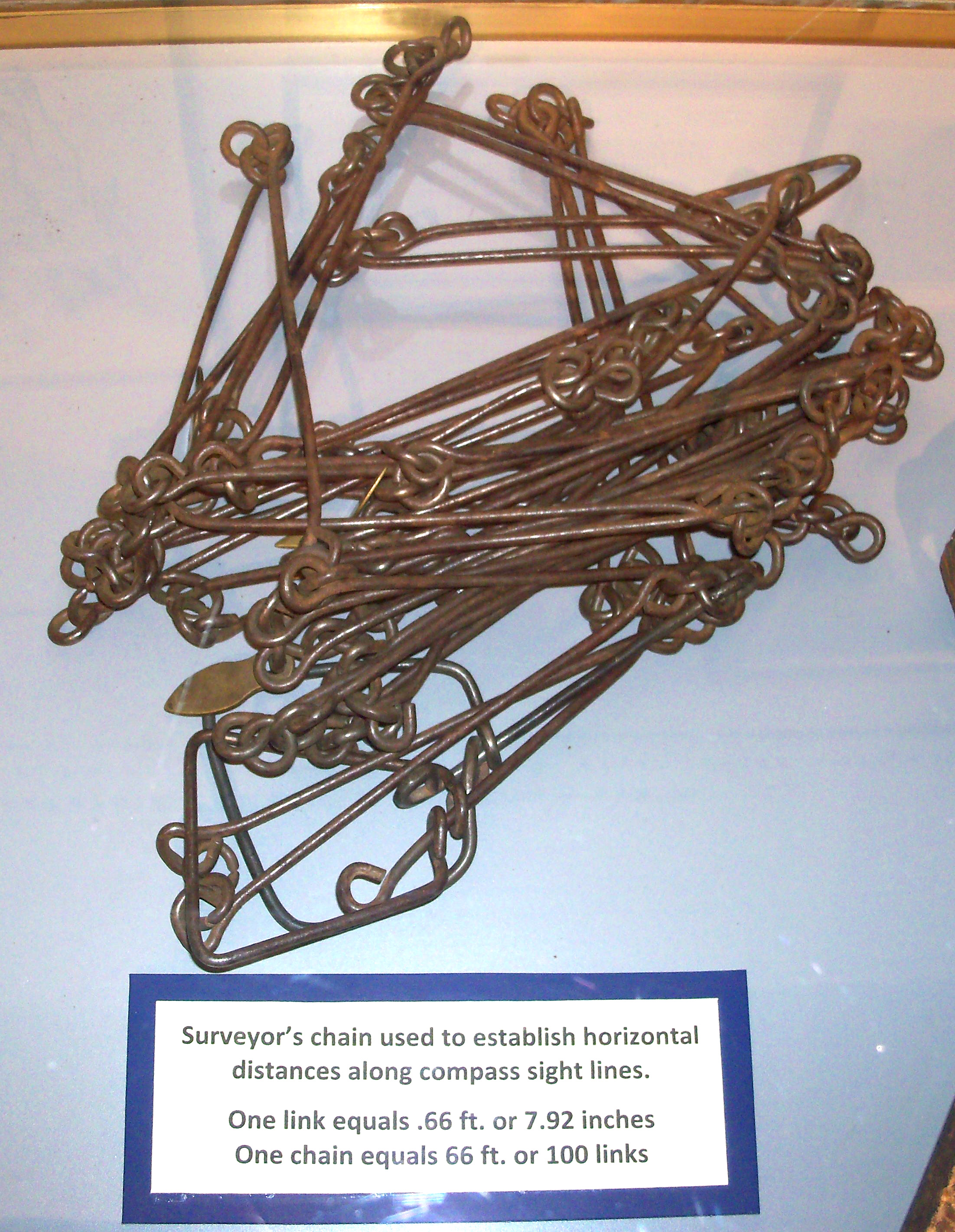
- The link is based on the length of one of the 100 individual segments in Gunter's chain, and is 0.66 feet long.

General information
- Unit system: Imperial/US units
- Unit of: length

Conversions
1 link in ...	... is equal to ...
- Imperial/US units: 7.92 in or 0.66 ft
- SI units: 20.12 cm

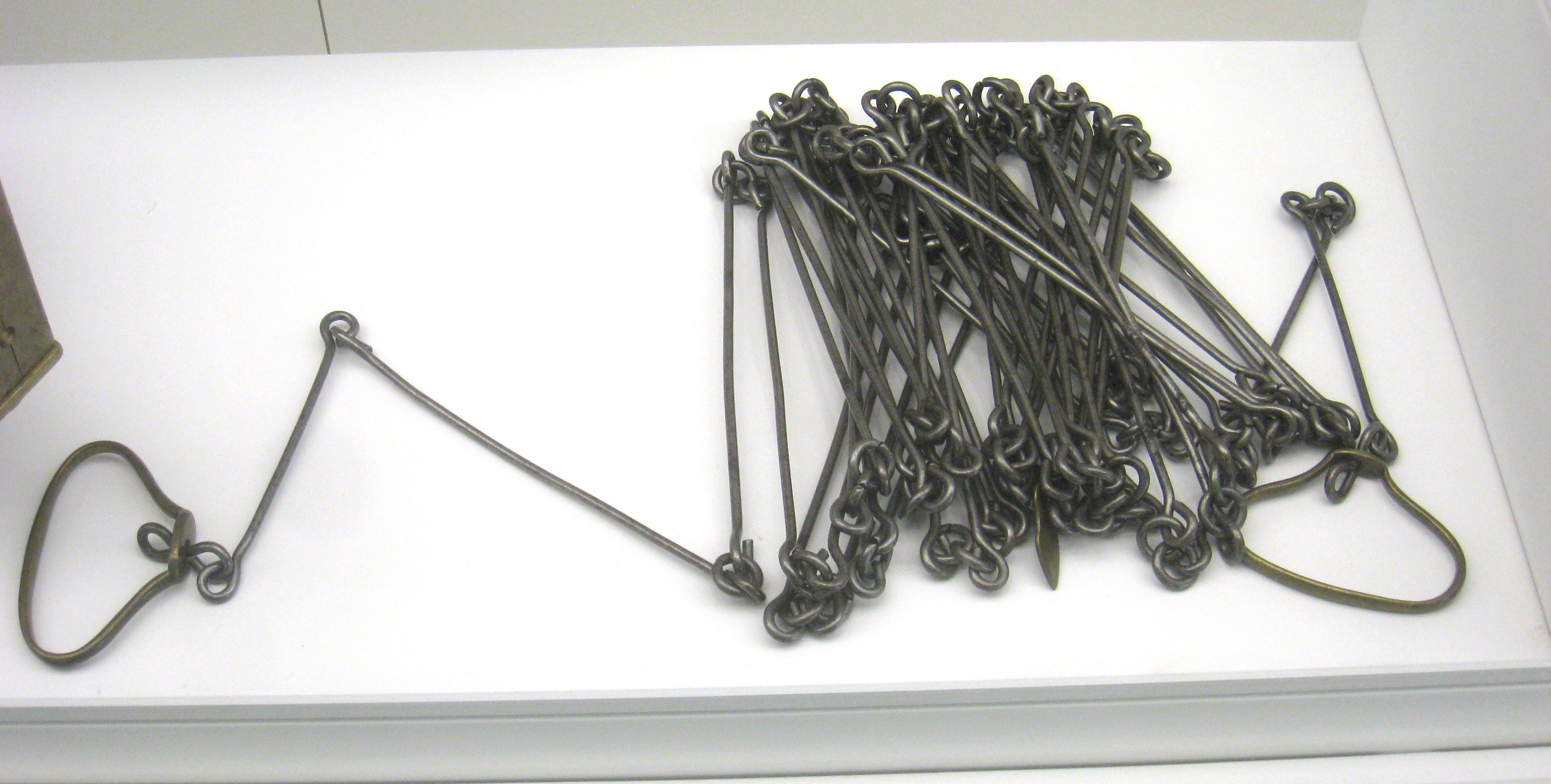
A Gunter's chain showing the individual links

The link (usually abbreviated as "l.", "li." or "lnk."), sometimes called a Gunter’s link, is a unit of length formerly used in many English-speaking countries. In US customary units modern definition, the link is exactly 66/100 of a US survey foot, or exactly 7.92 inches or 20.1168 cm.

The unit is based on Gunter's chain, a metal chain 66 feet long with 100 links, that was formerly used in land surveying. Even after the original tool was replaced by later instruments of higher precision, the unit was commonly used throughout the English-speaking world, for example in the United States customary units and the Imperial system. The length of the foot, and hence the link, varied slightly from place to place and time to time. In modern times the difference between the US survey foot and the international foot is two parts per million. The link fell out of general use in the 20th century.

== Proportions to other customary units ==
Twenty-five links make a rod, pole or perch (16.5 feet).
One hundred links make a chain.
One thousand links make a furlong.
Eight thousand links make a mile.

1 link	≡	0.01	chain
	≡	0.04	rod
	≡	0.66	foot
	≡	0.22	yard
	≡	7.92	inches

== History ==
Edmund Gunter designed and introduced the Gunter's chain in England in 1620. By correlating traditional English land measurements with the new decimal number system (which had just replaced Roman numerals), it combined ease and flexibility in taking surveying measurements in the field with ease of calculating results afterward. It rapidly gained acceptance in English surveying practice, which also began to adopt the tool's chain and link lengths as units of measure within the English system of units. As English dominions grew over time, its system of measures came to be used in many parts of the world.

When the American colonies broke their ties with Great Britain in 1776, they needed to establish a system of units that fell under their own political authority. While they adopted many of the British units, the length of the yard (which determined all other units of length) was by necessity governed by the length of a physical artifact. The one in American possession was slightly different in actual length from the British one, due to imprecision of manufacture. It was of only minor significance at the time.

In 1824, the United Kingdom officially reformed their system of units in legislation that established what came to be known as the Imperial system, but the standard of the yard remained the length of the artifact. The last replacement imperial artifact was made in bronze in 1845, and the most accurate measurement ever made of its length (much later) was 0.914 398 416 meters. In the U.S., the Mendenhall Order of 1893 tied the length of the U.S. yard to the meter, with the equivalence 39.37 inches = 1 meter, or approximately 0.914 401 828 803 658 meters per yard. In 1959, the international yard and pound agreement established the "international" yard length of 0.9144 meters, upon which both the customary U.S. and imperial units of length have since been based.

Even so, the Mendenhall Order length of the yard continues in use even in 2013 in the United States as the basis for the survey foot. The prior land survey data for North America of 1927 (NAD27) had been based on the survey foot, and a new triangulation based on the metric system (NAD83) was not released until 1986. Since that time, the State Plane Coordinate Systems (SPCSs) established by the U.S. Geodetic Survey have been based in SI units in all states. But a few states have established by law that they must remain available in survey feet as well.

In October 2019, the U.S. National Geodetic Survey and the National Institute of Standards and Technology announced their joint intent to retire the U.S. survey foot, with effect from the end of 2022. The link in U.S. Customary units is thereafter defined based on the International 1959 foot.

== Absolute length ==
In many measurement systems based on former English units, the link has remained fixed at 0.66 feet, therefore 0.22 yards or 7.92 inches; it is the absolute length of the yard that has varied. A rare remaining application of the link is in the service of some surveying in the United States, which relates to the definition of the survey foot. During most of its useful life, a modern degree of precision in the link's measure was neither expected nor possible.

With various definitions, 1 link is equal to:

- exact 201.168 mm (based on the International 1959 foot)
- approximate 201.167 652 mm (based on the per-1959 imperial foot)
- approximate 201.168 402 mm (based on the U.S. survey foot)

== See also ==
- Edmund Gunter
