= Delamain =

Delamain is a surname, and may refer to:

- Jacques Delamain (1874–1953), French naturalist
- Richard Delamaine or Delamain, the elder (before 1629 – before 1645), English mathematician
- Walter Sinclair Delamain (1862–1932), British Indian Army officer

== See also ==
- Delamain (Cognac producer)
