= Old St Peter and St Paul's Church, Albury =

Former Anglican church in Surrey, England

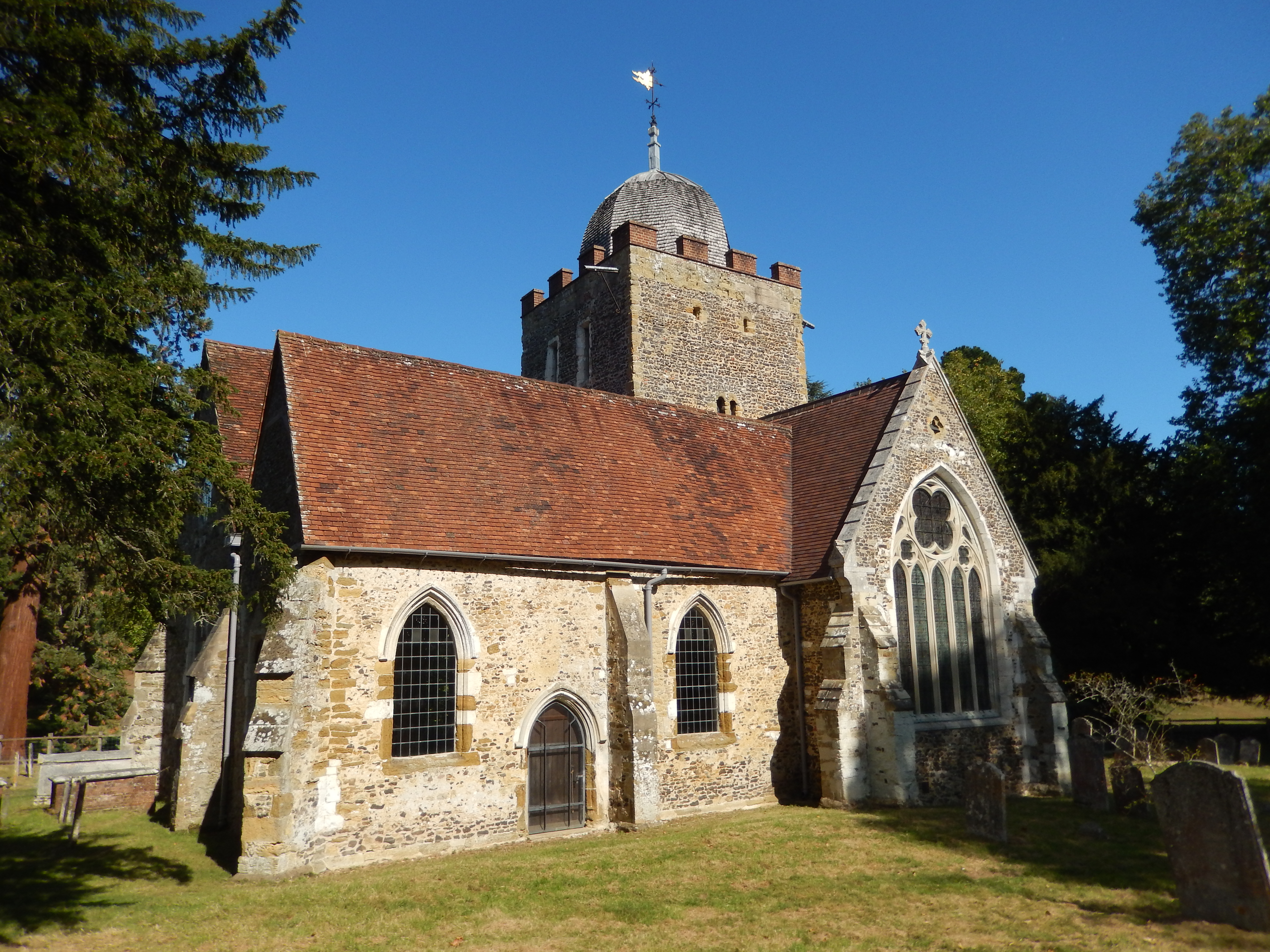
- Old St Peter and St Paul's Church, Albury

- Location in Surrey
- 51°13′12″N 0°28′44″W
- OS grid reference: TQ 063 479
- Location: Albury Park, Surrey
- Country: England
- Denomination: Anglican
- Website: Churches Conservation Trust

Architecture
- Heritage designation: Grade I
- Designated: 14 June 1967
- Architect: A. W. N. Pugin (mortuary chapel)
- Architectural type: Church
- Style: Anglo-Saxon, Gothic

Specifications
- Materials: Ironstone and sandstone rubble

Old St Peter and St Paul's Church is a former Anglican church near the village of Albury, Surrey, England in the care of The Churches Conservation Trust. It is recorded in the National Heritage List for England as a designated Grade I listed building. The church stands in Albury Park, to the northwest of Albury Hall, and between the villages of Albury and Shere.

== History ==
The nave of the church may date from the Anglo-Saxon era but has been considerably altered from the 14th century onward. The tower, of which the lower parts contain pre-Conquest masonry, may stand on the site of an earlier chancel, but was extended outwards and upwards in the 12th century. During the following century the chancel and south transept were added. The south aisle was added in the 14th century, and the north porch in the early 16th century.

In 1819 the Albury Park estate was bought by Henry Drummond, a London banker. During the following year the spire on the tower was replaced by a cupola. Drummond became involved with the foundation of the Catholic Apostolic Church in the 1830s, and built a church for this religious movement on his estate. The residents of Albury village had been coming to worship at their parish church in the estate, and Drummond proposed to close this church and to build a new Anglican church nearer the centre of the village. Building of both the new churches began in 1839. Drummond then commissioned A. W. N. Pugin to convert the south transept of the old church into a mortuary chapel.

== Architecture ==
=== Exterior ===
The plan of the church consists of a nave and chancel separated by a centrally-placed tower. The nave has a south aisle and there is a south transept projecting from the tower. There is a north porch towards the west of the nave. The tower is in three stages with a battlemented parapet, and a small north window. In the chancel is an east window dating from the late 13th century, and a lancet window in the south wall. The transept has two two-light windows in its east wall, and a five-light south window. At the west end of the church are two gables, an arched window, and a round window. The porch is gabled and has a bargeboard pierced with quatrefoils, rosettes and tracery.

The church is constructed in ironstone and sandstone rubble. The dressings are in Bargate stone and clunch. Part of the north wall is rendered, and the north porch is timber-framed. The nave is roofed with Horsham slabs, the aisle and porch with tiles, and the transept with slates. The cupola is shingled with wood, and has a metal finial.

=== Interior ===
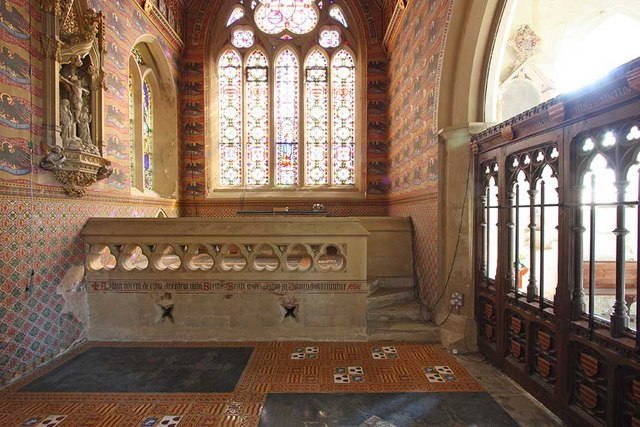
Pugin window in the south aisle

The nave is separated from the south aisle by a three-bay arcade carried on octagonal pillars. The timber nave roof dates from the 14th century. Around the walls are monuments dating from the 17th and 18th centuries. A 14th-century marble coffin slab is set into the floor of the aisle. In the west wall is a niche for a statue. Over the south door is a 15th-century wall painting of Saint Christopher. In the south wall of the aisle is a 14th-century piscina. The south transept (later the Drummond Chapel) contains Drummond's marble chest tomb. The walls of the chapel were painted in red and gold by T. Early, and the windows contain stained glass by William Wailes. The ceiling is panelled, and decorated in a quatrefoil pattern.

William Oughtred, the mathematician who invented the multiplication sign, was buried in the church. He lived from 1574 to 1660. He was rector of Albury for fifty years.

== External features ==
In the churchyard is a chest tomb inscribed "Tupper Vault", that commemorates the artists Arthur Devis and Anthony Devis. The tomb is designated as a Grade II listed building.

== See also ==
- List of churches preserved by the Churches Conservation Trust in South East England
- St Peter & St Paul's Church: The Churches Conservation Trust
