= Henry Coley =

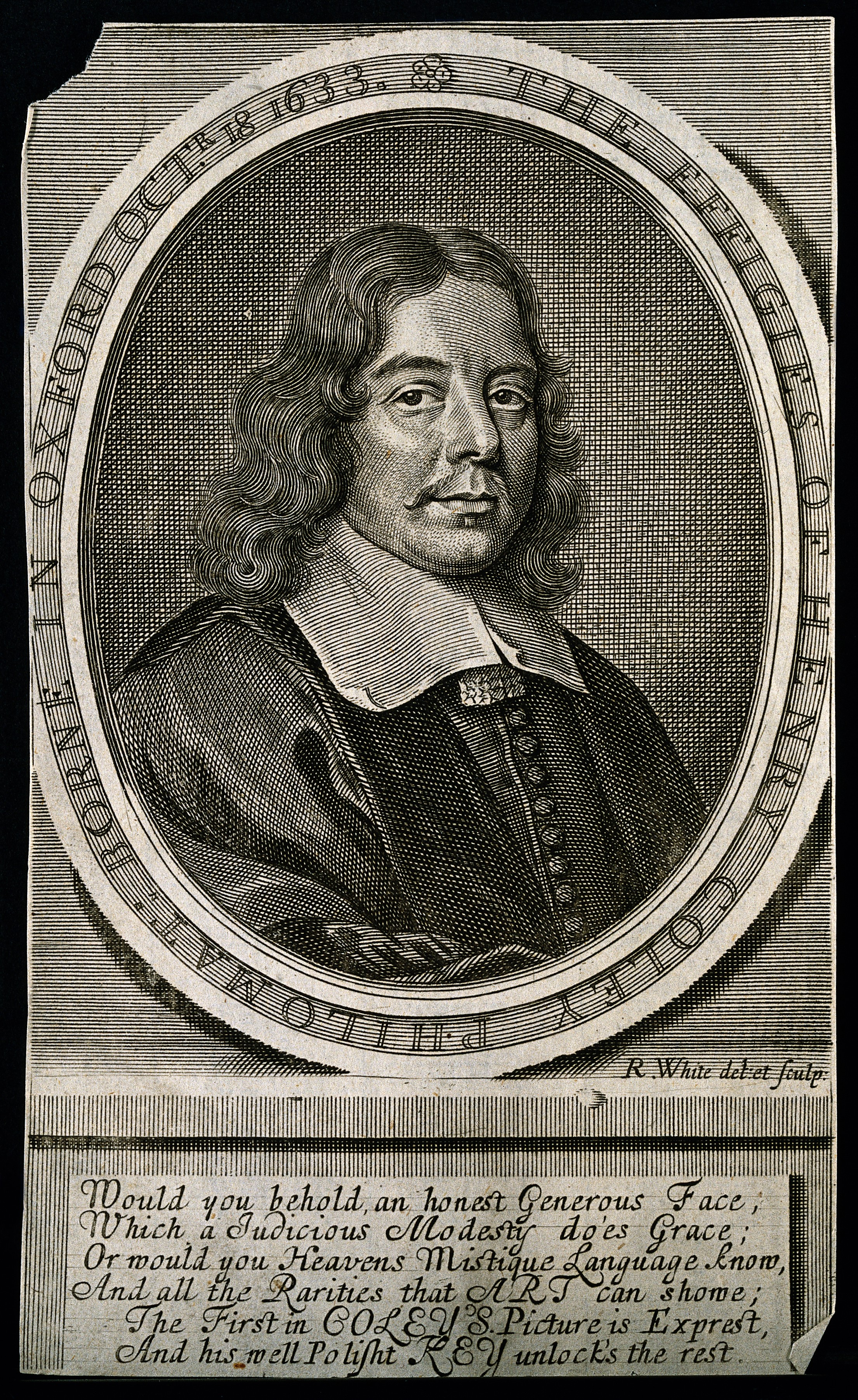
Portrait of Henry Coley, by Robert White (1676)

Henry Coley (18 October 1633 – 30 April 1704) was an astrologer and mathematician, and amanuensis of William Lilly.

== Early life and career ==
Coley was born, as shown in an inscription round a portrait of him by Robert White, found in some of his works, on 18 October 1633 in Oxford. His father was a joiner. In 1648 he became a clerk in the Parliamentary army; in 1654 he moved to London and worked as a ladies' tailor in Gray's Inn Lane.

In 1656 he married and they had one child; in 1660, after his wife's death, he married again; their son born in 1661 died soon after birth. He taught himself mathematics, astrology, Latin and French. From 1663 he lived in Baldwins Gardens, where he taught astrology and mathematics, and received clients. By the 1670s he had a flourishing practice.

In 1669 Coley published Clavis Astrologiæ Elimata; or a Key to the whole Art of Astrology, new filed and polished. It was well received. A second and enlarged edition was published in 1676; it was dedicated to Elias Ashmole, and included a tribute by William Lilly. In 1672, following the success of Clavis, he published the first number of his almanac, and it appeared annually until his death.

== William Lilly's amanuensis ==
Coley acted as William Lilly's amanuensis from 1677, when the latter was stricken with the illness of which he eventually died. The editor of Lilly's Autobiography tells us: "His judgments and observations for the succeeding years till his death were all composed by his directions, Mr. Coley coming to Hersham the beginning of every summer, and stayed there till by conference with him he had despatched them for the press; to whom at these opportunities he communicated his way of judgment and other 'Arcana.'"

Lilly constantly makes reference in his works to Coley's merit as a man and as a professor of mathematics and occult science. On his death in 1681, Lilly bequeathed to him his almanac Merlini Anglici Ephemeris, or Astrological Judgment for the Year, which had reached its thirty-sixth year of publication; from 1681 it was issued by Coley "according to the method of Mr. Lilly."

After Lilly's death, Coley continued to publish his predictions, as for instance, The great and wonderful Predictions of that late famous Astrologer, William Lilly, Mr. Partridge, and Mr. Coley concerning this present year 1683. Coley attained considerable distinction as a mathematician: we are told by his almanac that he taught "arithmetic, vulgar, decimal, and logarithmical, geometry, trigonometry, astronomy, navigation, the use of the celestial and terrestrial globes, dialling, surveying, gaging, measuring, and the art of astrology in all its branches," at Baldwins Gardens. He corrected and enlarged Joseph Moxon's Mathematics made easy (London, 1692), and also William Forster's Arithmetic, or that useful art made easie (London, 1686).

Coley died in London on 30 April 1704.
