= Gunter's chain =

Distance measuring device used for surveying

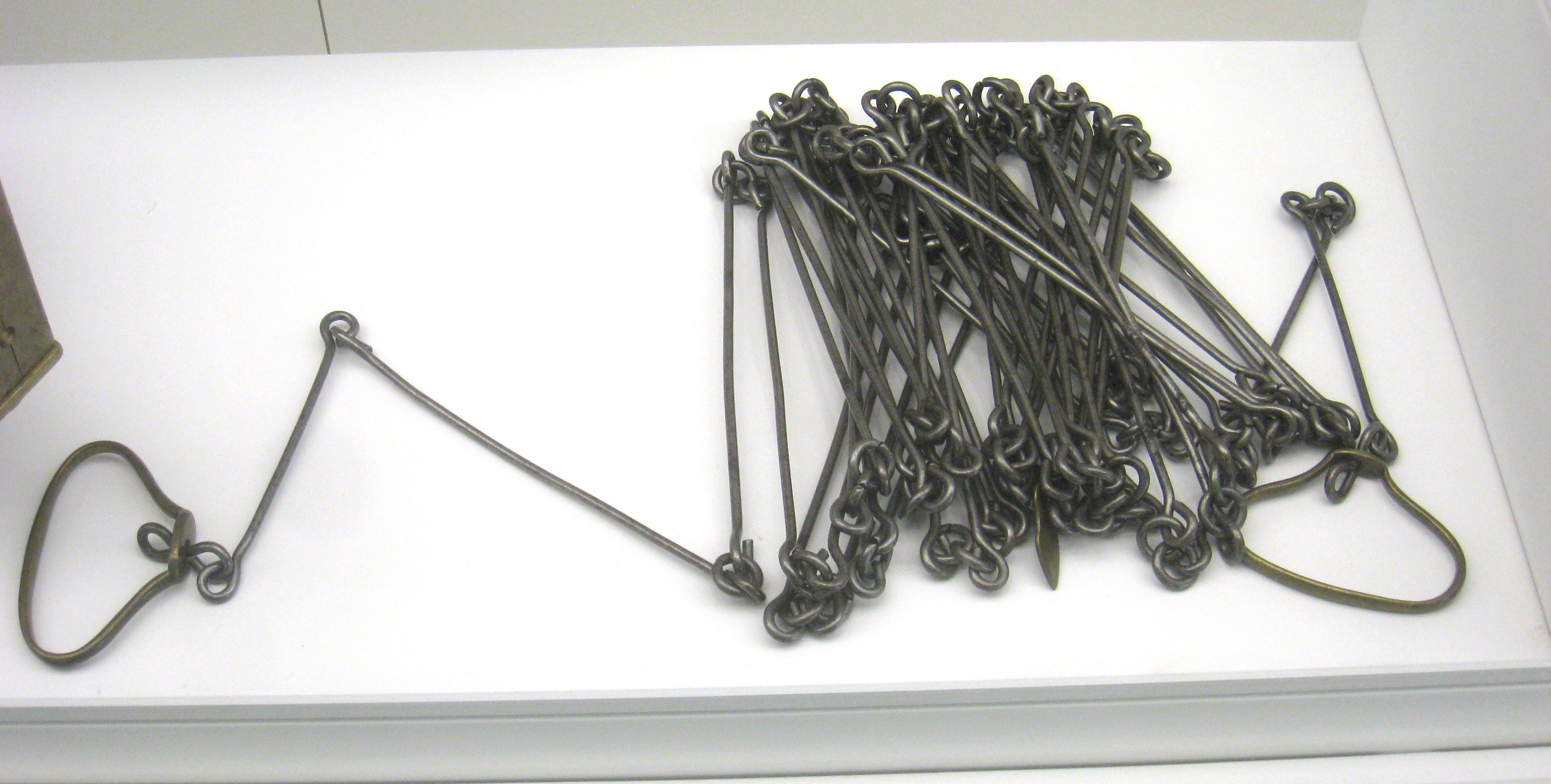
- Surveyor's chain, New York state, US, c. 1830. Exhibit in National Museum of American History, Washington, DC, US
- Other names: Gunter's measurement
- Classification: Measuring tool
- Uses: Surveying distance

Gunter's chain (also known as Gunter's measurement) is a distance-measuring device used for surveying. It was designed and introduced in 1620 by English clergyman and mathematician Edmund Gunter (1581–1626). It enabled plots of land to be accurately surveyed and plotted, for legal and commercial purposes.

Gunter developed a precise measuring chain of 100 links and a total length of 66 feet. These, the chain and the link, became statutory measures in England and subsequently the British Empire.

== Description ==
The 66-foot (20.1 m) chain is divided into 100 links, usually marked off into groups of 10 by brass rings or tags which simplify intermediate measurement. Each link is thus 7.92 inches (201 mm) long. A quarter chain, or 25 links, measures 16 feet 6 inches (5.03 m) and thus measures a rod (or pole). Ten chains measure a furlong and 80 chains measure a statute mile.

Gunter's chain reconciled two seemingly incompatible systems: the traditional English land measurements, based on the number four, and decimals based on the number 10. Since an acre measured 10 square chains in Gunter's system, the entire process of land area measurement could be computed using measurements in chains, and then converted to acres by dividing the results by 10. Hence 10 chains by 10 chains (100 square chains) equals 10 acres, 5 chains by 5 chains (25 square chains) equals 2.5 acres. By the 1670s the chain and the link had become statutory units of measurement in England.

...a Word or two of Dimensurators or Measuring Instruments, whereof the most usual has been the Chain, and the common length for English Measures 4 Poles, as answering indifferently to the English Mile and Acre, 10 such Chains in length making a Furlong, and 10 single square Chains an Acre, so that a square Mile contains 640 square Acres...'

— John Ogilby, Britannia, 1675

== Method ==
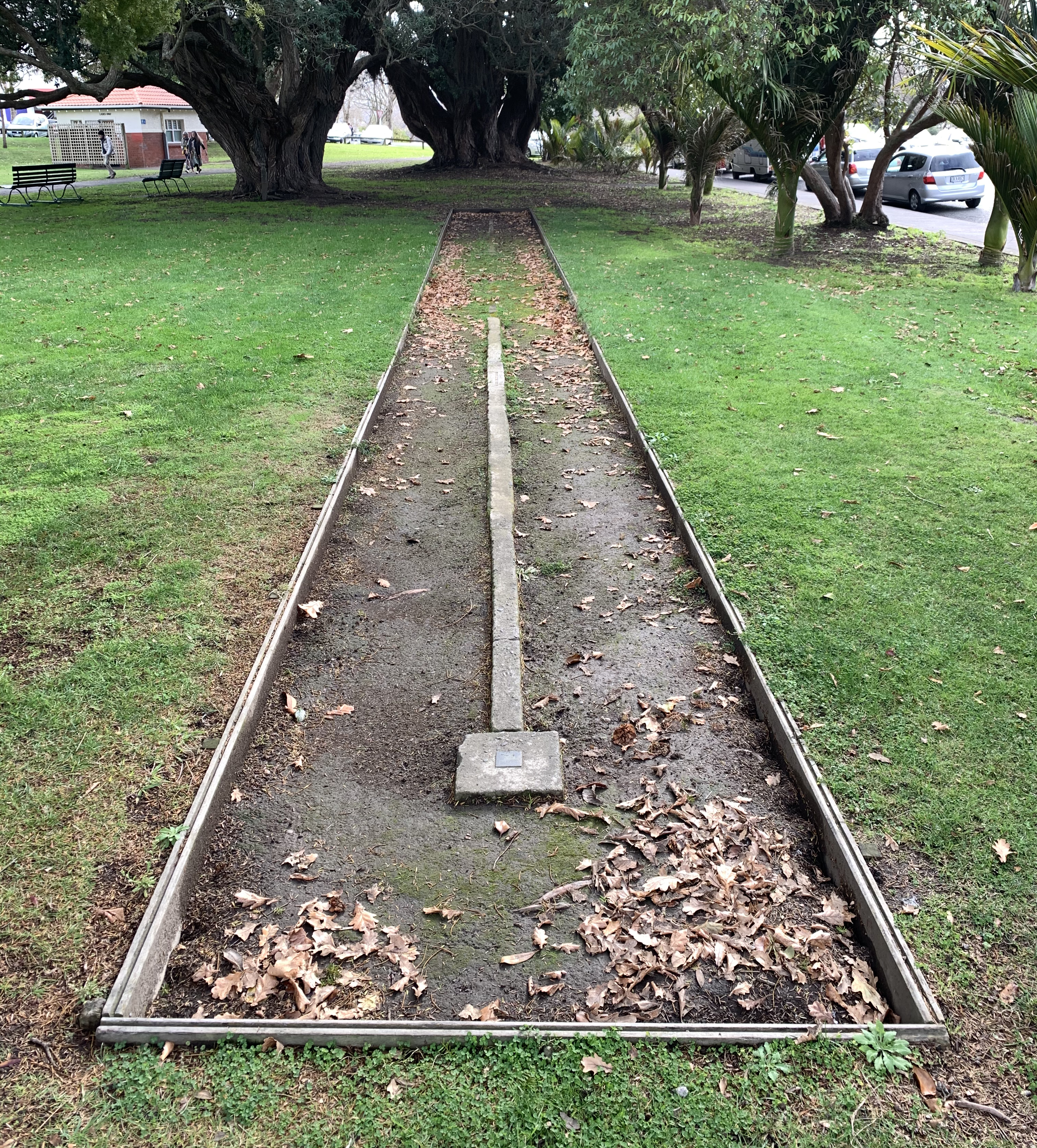
Standard chain mark in Whanganui, New Zealand, laid down in 1880 to standardize surveys

The method of surveying a field or other parcel of land with Gunter's chain is to first determine corners and other significant locations, and then to measure the distance between them, taking two points at a time. The surveyor is assisted by a chainman. A ranging rod (usually a prominently coloured wooden pole) is placed in the ground at the destination point. Starting at the originating point the chain is laid out towards the ranging rod, and the surveyor then directs the chainman to make the chain perfectly straight and pointing directly at the ranging rod. A pin is put in the ground at the forward end of the chain, and the chain is moved forward so that its hind end is at that point, and the chain is extended again towards the destination point. This process is called ranging, or in the US, chaining; it is repeated until the destination rod is reached, when the surveyor notes how many full lengths (chains) have been laid, and he can then directly read how many links (one-hundredth parts of the chain) are in the distance being measured. The chain usually ends in a handle which may or may not be part of the measurement. An inner loop (visible in the NMAH photograph) is the correct place to put the pin for some chains. Many chains were made with the handles as part of the end link and thus were included in the measurement.

The whole process is repeated for all the other pairs of points required, and it is a simple matter to make a scale diagram of the plot of land. The process is surprisingly accurate and requires only very low technology. Surveying with a chain is simple if the land is level and continuous—it is not physically practicable to range across large depressions or significant waterways, for example. On sloping land, the chain was to be "leveled" by raising one end as needed, so that undulations did not increase the apparent length of the side or the area of the tract.

== Unit of length ==
Although link chains were later superseded by the steel ribbon tape (a form of tape measure), its legacy was a new statutory unit of length called the chain, equal to 22 yards (66 feet) of 100 links. This unit still exists as a location identifier on British railways, as well as all across America in what is called the public land survey system. In the United States (US), for example, Public Lands Survey plats are published in the chain unit to maintain the consistency of a two-hundred-year-old database. In the Midwest of the US it is not uncommon to encounter deeds with references to chains, poles, or rod units, especially in farming country. Minor roads surveyed in Australia and New Zealand in the 19th and early 20th centuries are customarily one chain wide.

The length of a cricket pitch is one chain (22 yards).

== Similar measuring chains ==
=== Metric chains ===
In France after the French Revolution, and later in countries that had adopted the Metric System, 10-metre (32 ft 9.7 in) chains, of 50 links each 200 millimetres (7.87 in) long were used until the 1950s.

Metric chains, of lengths 5 m, 10 m, 20 m and 30 m, are widely used in India. Tolerances are ±3 mm for 5 m and 10 m chains, ±5 mm for a 20 m chain, and ±8 mm for a 30 m chain. Links are 200 millimetres (7.87 in) long.

=== Revenue chain ===
In India, a revenue chain with 16 links and of length 10 ft (3.0 m) is used in cadastral surveys.

=== Ramsden's chain (Engineer's chain) ===
A longer chain of 100 feet (30.5 m), with a hundred 1 foot (305 mm) links, was devised in the UK in the late 18th century by Jesse Ramsden, though it never supplanted Gunter's chain. Surveyors also sometimes used such a device, and called it the engineer's chain. The original of such chains was that constructed, to very high precision, for the measurement of the baselines of the Anglo-French Survey (1784–1790) and the Principal Triangulation of Great Britain. A similar American system, of lesser popularity, is Ramsden's or the engineer's system, where the chain consists also of 100 links, each one foot (0.3048 m) long. The even less common Rathborn system, also from the 17th century, is based on a 200-link chain of two rods (33 feet, 10.0584 m) length. Each rod (or perch or pole) consists of 100 links, (1.98 inches, 50.292 mm each), which are called seconds (″), ten of which make a prime (′, 19.8 inches, 0.503 m).

=== Vara or Texas chain ===
In the Southwestern United States, the vara chain also called the Texas chain, of 20 varas (16.9164 m (55.5 ft)) was used in surveying Spanish and later Mexican land grants, such as the major Fisher–Miller and Paisano Grants in Texas, several similarly large ones in New Mexico, and over 200 smaller ranchos in California.

=== Wing's chain ===
Vincent Wing made chains with 9.90-inch links, most commonly as 33-foot half-chains of 40 links. These chains were sometimes used in the American colonies, particularly Pennsylvania.

=== Similar instruments ===
Other instruments used for measuring distance include tapes and bands. A steel band is also known as a "band chain".

== See also ==
- Distance measurement
- Laser rangefinder
