= Chain (unit) =

Unit of length

chain
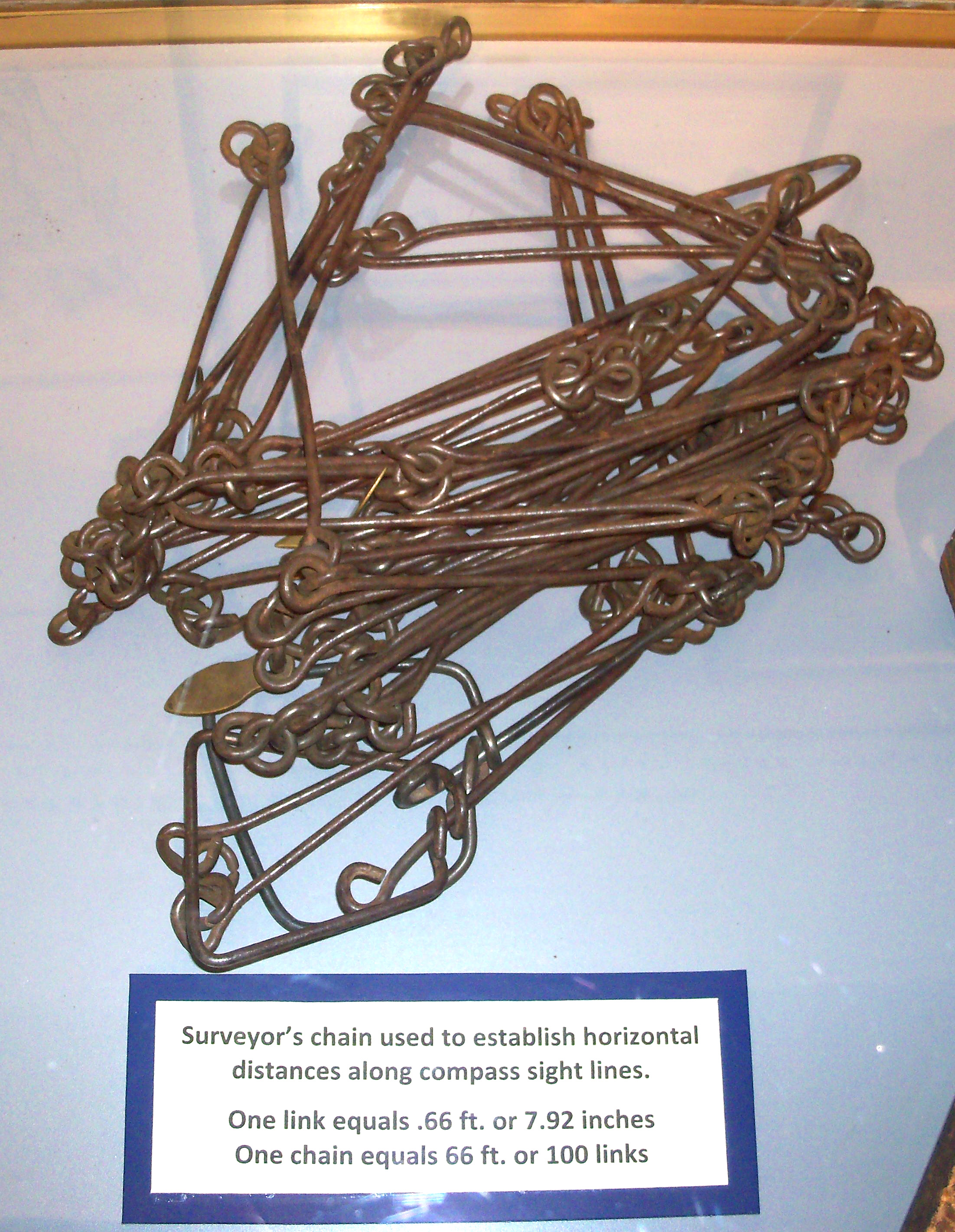
- The chain is based on the length of Gunter's chain, which is 66 feet (22 yd) long.

General information
- Unit system: Imperial/US units
- Unit of: length
- Symbol: ch

Conversions
1 ch in ...	... is equal to ...
- Imperial/US units: 22 yd, 66 ft, 100 links
- Metric (SI) units: 20.1168 m

The chain (abbreviated ch) is a unit of length equal to 66 feet (22 yards), used in both the US customary and Imperial unit systems. It is subdivided into 100 links. There are 10 chains in a furlong, and 80 chains in one statute mile. In metric terms, it is 20.1168 metres long. By extension, chainage (running distance) is the distance along a curved or straight survey line from a fixed commencing point, as given by an odometer.

The chain has been used since the early 17th century in England, and was taken by British settlers during the colonial period to other countries around the globe. In the United Kingdom, there were 80 chains to the mile, but until the early nineteenth century the Scottish customary mile and Irish customary mile were each longer than the statute mile; consequently a Scots chain was about 74 (imperial) feet, an Irish chain 84 feet. These longer chains became obsolete following the adoption of the imperial system of units in 1824. In India, "metric chains" of exactly 20 metres (65.62 feet) are used, along with fractions thereof.

== Definition ==
The UK statute chain is 22 yards, which is 66 feet (20.1168 m). This unit is a statute measure in the United Kingdom, defined in the Weights and Measures Act 1985. One link is a hundredth part of a chain, which is 7.92 inches (20.1168 cm).

A surveyor's chain first appears in an illustration in a Dutch map of 1607, and in an English book for surveyors of 1610. In 1593 the English mile was redefined by a statute of Queen Elizabeth I as 5,280 feet, to tie in with agricultural practice. In 1620, the polymath Edmund Gunter developed a method of accurately surveying land using a surveyor's chain 66 feet long with 100 links. The 66-foot unit, which was four perches or rods, took on the name the chain. By 1675 it was accepted, and Ogilby wrote:

...a Word or two of Dimensurators or Measuring Instruments, whereof the most usual has been the Chain, and the common length for English Measures 4 Poles, as answering indifferently to the English Mile and Acre, 10 such Chains in length making a Furlong, and 10 single square Chains an Acre, so that a square Mile contains 640 square Acres...

— John Ogilby, Britannia, 1675

From Gunter's system, the chain and the link became standard surveyors' units of length and crossed to the colonies. The thirteen states of America were expanding westward and the public land had to be surveyed for a cadastral. In 1784 Thomas Jefferson wrote a report for the Continental Congress proposing the rectangular survey system; it was adopted with some changes as the Land Ordinance of 1785 on 20 May the following year. In the report, the use of the chain as a unit of measurement was mandated, and the chain was defined.

The chain is the unit of linear measurement for the survey of the public lands as prescribed by law. All returns of measurement in the rectangular system are made in the true horizontal distance in links, chains, and miles. The only exceptions to this rule are special requirements for measurement in feet in mineral surveys and townsite surveys.

Linear Measurement

1 Chain = 100 links or 66 feet
1 Mile = 80 chains or 5,280 feet

Area Measurement

1 Acre = 10 square chains or 43,560 square feet
1 square mile = 640 acres

— Lola Cazier (1976), Surveys and Surveyors of the Public Domain 1785-1975, page 15

== Modern use and historic cultural references ==
=== United Kingdom ===
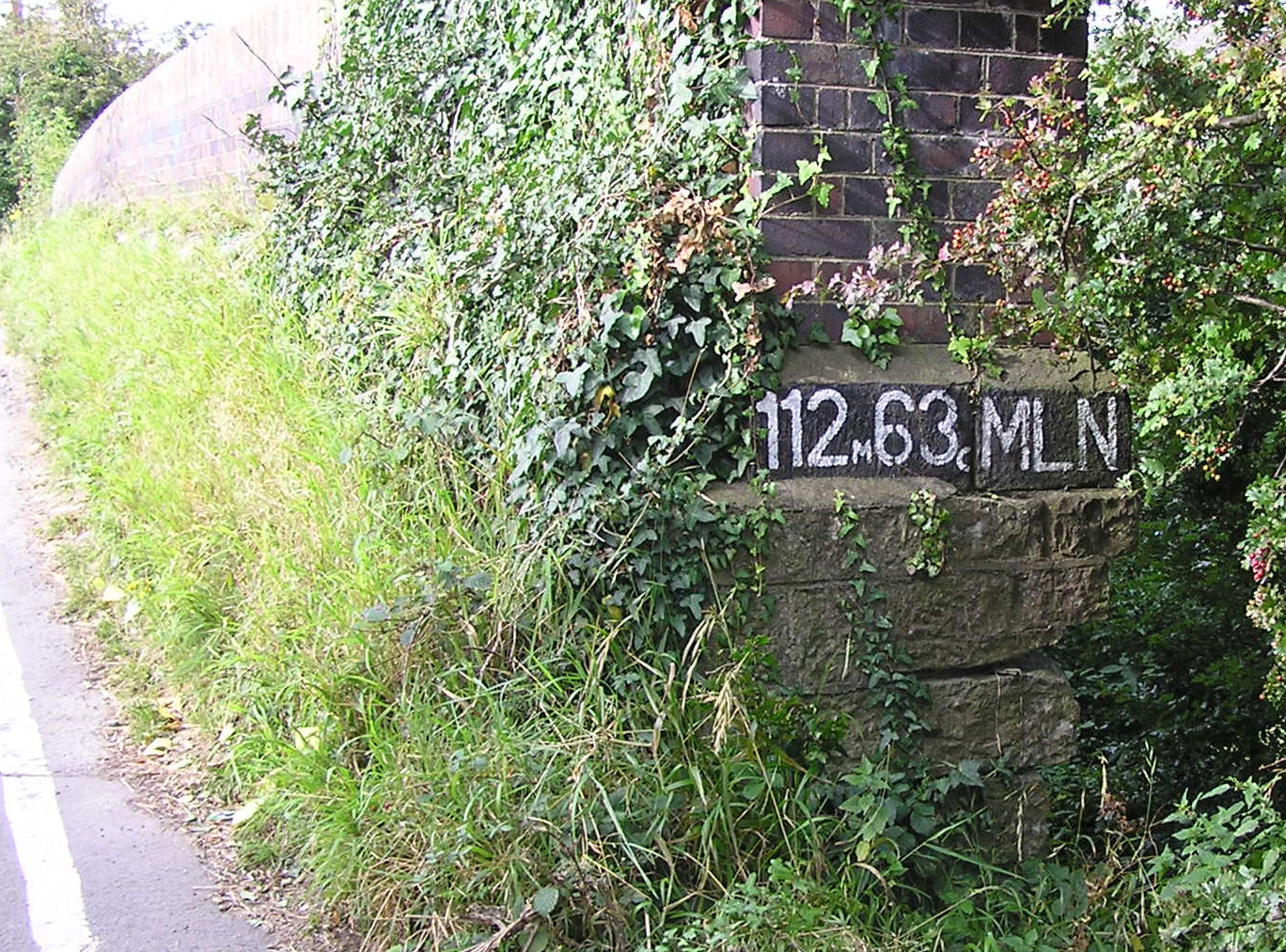
Location marker painted on a British railway bridge, showing 112 miles and 63 chains; photograph taken August 2007

In the United Kingdom, the chain is no longer used for practical survey work. However, it is still used on the railways as a location identifier. When railways were designed, the location of features such as bridges and stations was indicated by a cumulative longitudinal "mileage", using miles and chains, from a zero point at the origin or headquarters of the railway, or the originating junction of a new branch line. Since railways are linear in topology, the "mileage" or "chainage" is sufficient to identify a place uniquely on any given route. Thus, a given bridge location may be indicated as 112 miles and 63 chains (181.51 km) from the origin. In the case of the photograph, the bridge is near Keynsham, which is that distance from London Paddington station. The indication "MLN" after the mileage is the Engineer's Line Reference describing the route as the Great Western Main Line, which is needed to uniquely determine the bridge, as there may be points at 112 miles 63 chains on other routes.

On new railway lines built in the United Kingdom such as High Speed 1, the position along the alignment is still referred to as "chainage", although the value is now expressed in metres.

=== North America ===
The use of the chain was mandatory in laying out US townships. A federal law was passed in 1785 (the Public Land Survey Ordinance) that all official government surveys must be done with a Gunter's (surveyor's) chain. Chains and links are commonly encountered in older metes and bounds legal descriptions. Distances on township plat maps made by the US General Land Office are shown in chains.

Under the US Public Land Survey System, parcels of land are often described in terms of the section (640 acres or 259 hectares), quarter-section (160 acres or 64.7 hectares), and quarter-quarter-section (40 acres or 16.19 hectares). Respectively, these square divisions of land are approximately 80 chains (one mile or 1.6 km), 40 chains (half a mile or 800 m), and 20 chains (a quarter mile or 400 m) on a side.

The chain is still used in agriculture: measuring wheels with a circumference of 0.1 chain (diameter ≈ 2.1 ft or 64 cm) are still readily available in Canada and the United States. For a rectangular tract, multiplying the number of turns of a chain wheel for each of two adjacent sides and dividing by 1,000 gives the area in acres.

In Canada, road allowances were originally 1 chain wide and are now 20 metres.

The unit was also used in mapping the United States along train routes in the 19th century. Railroads in the United States have long since used decimal fractions of a mile. Some subways such as the New York City Subway and the Washington Metro were designed with and continue with a chaining system using the 100-foot engineer's chain.

In the United States, the chain is also used as the measure of the rate of spread of wildfires (chains per hour), both in the predictive National Fire Danger Rating System as well as in after-action reports. The term chain is used by wildland firefighters in day-to-day operations as a unit of distance.

=== Australia and New Zealand ===
In Australia and New Zealand, most building lots in the past were a quarter of an acre, measuring one chain by two and a half chains, and other lots would be multiples or fractions of a chain. The street frontages of many houses in these countries are one chain wide—roads were almost always 1 chain (20.1 m) wide in urban areas, sometimes 1.5 chains (30.2 m) or 2.5 chains (50.3 m). Laneways would be half a chain (10.1 m). In rural areas the roads were wider, up to 10 chains (201.2 m) where a stock route was required. 5 chains (100.6 m) roads were surveyed as major roads or highways between larger towns, 3 chains (60.4 m) roads between smaller localities, and 2 chains (40.2 m) roads were local roads in farming communities. Roads named Three Chain Road etc. persist today.

The "Queen's Chain" is a concept that has long existed in New Zealand, of a strip of public land, usually 20 metres (or one chain in pre-metric measure) wide from the high water mark, that has been set aside for public use along the coast, around many lakes, and along all or part of many rivers. These strips exist in various forms (including road reserves, esplanade reserves, esplanade strips, marginal strips and reserves of various types) but not as extensively and consistently as is often assumed.

=== Cricket pitches ===
The chain also survives as the length of a cricket pitch, being the distance between the wickets.

== See also ==
- Gunter's chain (the basis for this standard unit of length)
- Surveyors' chains including metric chains
- Ramsden surveying instruments – Instruments used in surveys 1784 to 1853
