= Richard Delamaine =

English mathematician

Richard Delamain Portrait

Richard Delamain or Delamaine, known as the elder (born about 1600 – died about 1645), was an English engineer and teacher of mathematics, known for being the inventor of the slide rule and developing an horizontal quadrant for astronomical calculations.

== Life ==
Delamain learned mathematics from the lectures by Edmund Gunter and the respective chats in Gunter rooms at Gresham College. Then he earned his living as teacher of mathematics. Delamain enjoyed royal favour and was appointed tutor to the king in mathematics, engineer and finally quartermaster-general. After his death, his widow described him in those terms, in 1645, when she petitioned the House of Lords. He left ten children, one of whom bore his name, who is tentatively identified with the mathematician Richard Delamain the younger. Delamain died in the civil war that dethroned Charles I, by 1945.

Delamain dedicated his first published work, Grammelogia, to King Charles I. With it, he gave that first circular slide rule to him as a present and obtained a patent for 10 years. His design, two concentric rings, each with a logarithmic scale and without the need of a cursor, is substantially different from the disc with a single logarithmic scale and two cursors that William Oughtred, with the assistance of Elias Allen, invented afterwards.

He was attacked in William Forster's Circles of Proportion (1631) for plagiarism regarding Oughtred's work, which is not true, since his invention, as such, is different from Oughtred's, and both are based on the logarithmic ruler for navigation invented in 1624 by Edmund Gunter.

Charles I, just before his death, sent to his son James, Duke of York a silver ring slide rule made by Elias Allen on the plan here described by Delamain.

== Works ==
He wrote:

- 1630: Grammelogia or the Mathematicall Ring. With it, he presents the invention of the slide rule, in his case in the form of two rings. The title, Grammelogia, which means "the discourse of lines", alludes to John Napier's instrument Rabdologia or "the discourse of rods". F. Cajori indicates that there were five editions of this book; in the next ones, the author includes alternative designs, some of these for greater accuracy in calculations.
- 1631: The Making, Description, and Use of a small portable Instrument ... called a Horizontal Quadrant. Instrument for multiple calculation in the field of Astronomy. Derived from the quadrant by Edmund Gunter, it also generated a conflict with the horizontal instrument from William Oughtred.
