= Edmund Gunter =

English clergyman, mathematician, geometer and astronomer

Edmund Gunter (1581 – 10 December 1626), was an English clergyman, mathematician, geometer and astronomer of Welsh descent. He is best remembered for his mathematical contributions, which include the invention of the Gunter's chain, the Gunter's quadrant, and the Gunter's scale. In 1620, he invented the first successful analogue device which he developed to calculate logarithmic tangents.

He was mentored in mathematics by Reverend Henry Briggs and eventually became a Gresham Professor of Astronomy, from 1619 until his death.

== Biography ==
Gunter was born in Hertfordshire in 1581. He was educated at Westminster School, and in 1599 he matriculated at Christ Church, Oxford. He took orders, became a preacher in 1614, and in 1615 proceeded to the degree of bachelor in divinity. He became rector of St. George's Church in Southwark.

Mathematics, particularly the relationship between mathematics and the real world, was the one overriding interest throughout his life. In 1619, Sir Henry Savile put up money to fund Oxford University's first two science faculties, the chairs of astronomy and geometry. Gunter applied to become professor of geometry but Savile was famous for distrusting clever people, and Gunter's behaviour annoyed him intensely. As was his habit, Gunter arrived with his sector and quadrant, and began demonstrating how they could be used to calculate the position of stars or the distance of churches, until Savile could stand it no longer. "Doe you call this reading of Geometric?" he burst out. "This is mere showing of tricks, man!" and, according to a contemporary account, "dismissed him with scorne."

He was shortly thereafter championed by the far wealthier Earl of Bridgewater, who saw to it that on 6 March 1619 Gunter was appointed professor of astronomy in Gresham College, London. This post he held till his death.

With Gunter's name are associated several useful inventions, descriptions of which are given in his treatises on the sector, cross-staff, bow, quadrant and other instruments. He contrived his sector about the year 1606, and wrote a description of it in Latin, but it was more than sixteen years afterwards before he allowed the book to appear in English. In 1620 he published his Canon triangulorum. (Note: The site http://locomat.loria.fr contains a complete reconstruction of Gunter's book and table.)

In 1624 Gunter published a collection of his mathematical works. It was entitled The description and use of sector, the cross-staffe, and other instruments for such as are studious of mathematical practise. One of the most remarkable things about this book is that it was written, and published, in English not Latin. "I am at the last contented that it should come forth in English," he wrote resignedly, "Not that I think it worthy either of my labour or the publique view, but to satisfy their importunity who not understand the Latin yet were at the charge to buy the instrument." It was a manual not for cloistered university fellows but for sailors and surveyors in real world.

There is reason to believe that Gunter was the first to discover (in 1622 or 1625) that the magnetic needle does not retain the same declination in the same place at all times. By desire of James I he published in 1624 The Description and Use of His Majesties Dials in Whitehall Garden, the only one of his works which has not been reprinted. He coined the terms cosine and cotangent, and he suggested to Henry Briggs, his friend and colleague, the use of the arithmetical complement (see Briggs Arithmetica Logarithmica, cap. xv). His practical inventions are briefly noted below:

== Gunter's chain ==
Gunter's interest in geometry led him to develop a method of land surveying using triangulation. Linear measurements could be taken between topographical features such as corners of a field, and using triangulation the field or other area could be plotted on a plane, and its area calculated. A chain is 22 yards or 66-foot (20.1 m) long, with intermediate measurements indicated, was chosen for the purpose, and is called Gunter's chain.

The length of the chain chosen, 66-foot (20.1 m), being called a chain gives a unit easily converted to area. Therefore, a parcel of 10 square chains gives 1 acre. The area of any parcel measured in chains will thereby be easily calculated.

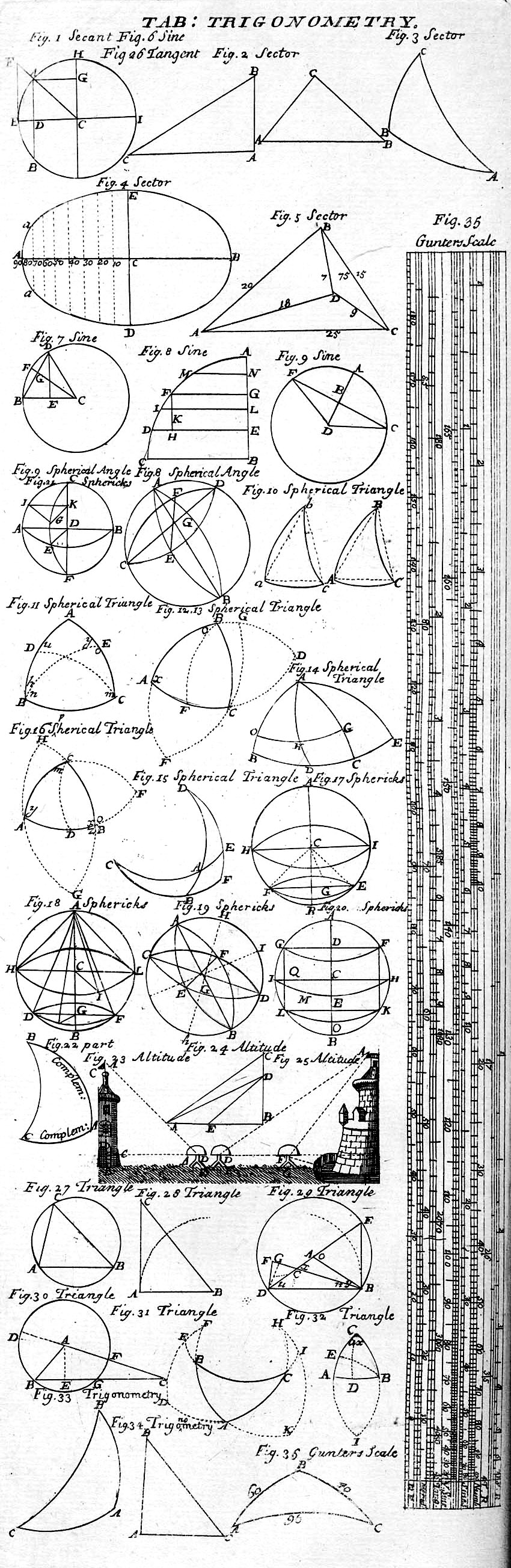
Table of Trigonometry, from the 1728 Cyclopaedia, Volume 2 featuring a Gunter's scale

== Gunter's quadrant ==
Gunter's quadrant is an instrument made of wood, brass or other substance, containing a kind of stereographic projection of the sphere on the plane of the equinoctial, the eye being supposed to be placed in one of the poles, so that the tropic, ecliptic, and horizon form the arcs of circles, but the hour circles are other curves, drawn by means of several altitudes of the sun for some particular latitude every year. This instrument is used to find the hour of the day, the sun's azimuth, etc., and to solve other common problems of the sphere or globe, and also to take the altitude of an object in degrees.

A rare Gunter quadrant, made by Henry Sutton and dated 1657, can be described as follows: It is a conveniently sized and high-performance instrument that has two pin-hole sights, and the plumb line is inserted at the vertex. The front side is designed as a Gunter quadrant and the rear side as a trigonometric quadrant. The side with the astrolabe has hour lines, a calendar, zodiacs, star positions, astrolabe projections, and a vertical dial. The side with the geometric quadrants features several trigonometric functions, rules, a shadow quadrant, and the chorden line.

== Gunter's scale ==
Gunter's scale or Gunter's rule, generally called the "Gunter" by seamen, is a large plane scale, usually 2 feet (610 mm) long by about 1½ inches broad (40 mm), engraved with various scales, or lines. On one side are placed the natural lines (as the line of chords, the line of sines, tangents, rhumbs, etc.), and on the other side the corresponding artificial or logarithmic ones. By means of this instrument questions in navigation, trigonometry, etc., are solved with the aid of a pair of compasses. It is a predecessor of the slide rule, a calculating aid used from the 17th century until the 1970s.

Gunter's line, or line of numbers refers to the logarithmically divided scale, like the most common scales used on slide rules for multiplication and division.

== Gunter rig ==
A sail rig which resembles a gaff rig, with the gaff nearly vertical, is called a Gunter rig, or "sliding gunter" from its resemblance to a Gunter's rule.

== See also ==
- Gresham Professor of Astronomy
- History of geomagnetism
