= Speidel (surname) =

Speidel or von Speidel is a surname. Notable people with the surname include:

- Albert von Speidel (1858–1912), Bavarian general and artistic director of the court theatre in Munich after 1905
- Bill Speidel (1912–1988), American author
- Edmund Freiherr von Speidel (1816–1887), Bavarian general and court marshal
- Emil Speidel (1859–1938), German professor in Tübingen and upper level forestry council member
- Hans Speidel (1897–1984), German general
- Hans-Georg von Seidel (1891–1955), German general of the Luftwaffe
- Johann Jakob Speidel (1595?–1666), German jurist
- Jutta Speidel (born 1954), German actress
- Michael P. Speidel (born 1937), German-born American military historian
- Maximilian von Speidel (1856–1943), Bavarian general and State Council

Persons named Speidell include:

- John Speidell (fl. 1600–1634), English mathematician
- Todd H. Speidell (born 1957), American theologian
