= Ezechiel de Decker =

Ezechiel de Decker (c. 1603-c. 1647) was a Dutch surveyor and teacher of mathematics.

== Tables of logarithms ==
In 1625, De Decker entered a contract with Adriaan Vlacq for the publication of several translations of books by John Napier, Edmund Gunter and Henry Briggs. A first book was published in 1626, with several translations done by Vlacq. A second book was made of the logarithms of the first 10000 numbers from Briggs' Arithmetica logarithmica published in 1624. The logarithms were shortened to 10 places. In 1627, De Decker's "Tweede deel" was published and it contained the logarithms of all numbers from 1 to 100000, to 10 places. Only very few copies of this book are known and its publication was apparently stopped or delayed. In 1628, Vlacq's Arithmetica logarithmica was published and contained exactly the tables published in 1627.

== Publications ==
- Ezechiel de Decker: Eerste Deel van de Nieuwe Telkonst, 1626
- Ezechiel de Decker: Nieuwe Telkonst, 1626
- Ezechiel de Decker: Tweede Deel van de Nieuwe Tel-konst, 1627 (partial facsimile published in 1964)
