= Henry Sutton (instrument maker) =

Henry Sutton (ca. 1637-1665) was an English instrument maker who operated out of London from 1650 to 1661. He is known for his high-quality engravings of scales and quadrants.

His colleagues included Samuel Knibb (1625-1674) and John Marke (17th century). He was described in the 18th century by Edmund Stone thus: "Mr Sutton's Quadrants, made above one hundred Years ago, are the finest divided Instruments in the World; and the Regularity and Exactness of the vast Number of Circles drawn upon them is highly delightful to behold".

Little is known of Sutton's life beyond his mathematical contributions. He died of the plague in 1665. His place of work and the range of his stock can be determined from the following advertisement, written on a quadrant dated 1658: "This Instrument or any of the Mathematiques are made in Brass or Wood by Henry Sutton Instrument maker behind the royall exchange". The Royal Exchange, which is now a shopping complex, was a major landmark in mid 17th-century London, having been built in the 1560s as a centre for merchants and tradesmen to do business. Sutton's shop on Threadneedle Street behind the Exchange would have been an important location for mathematical practitioners; not only did he make and sell instruments, he also collaborated on their design and sold mathematical books. One of his instruments includes the name of Euclid Speidell, a mathematical teacher and writer also based in London.

The Oxford Museum of the History of Science has acquired two of his quadrants along with a small amount of his prints, and cites him as "perhaps the most talented and original mathematical instrument maker in London in the middle of the seventeenth century".
