= Mirifici Logarithmorum Canonis Descriptio =

First publication of complete tables of logarithms, 1614

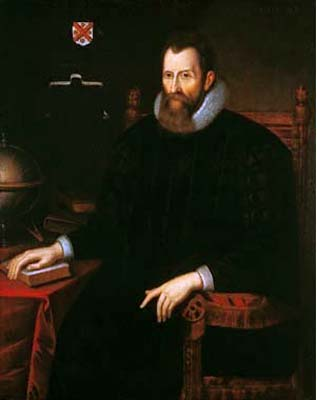
John Napier (1550–1617), the inventor of logarithms

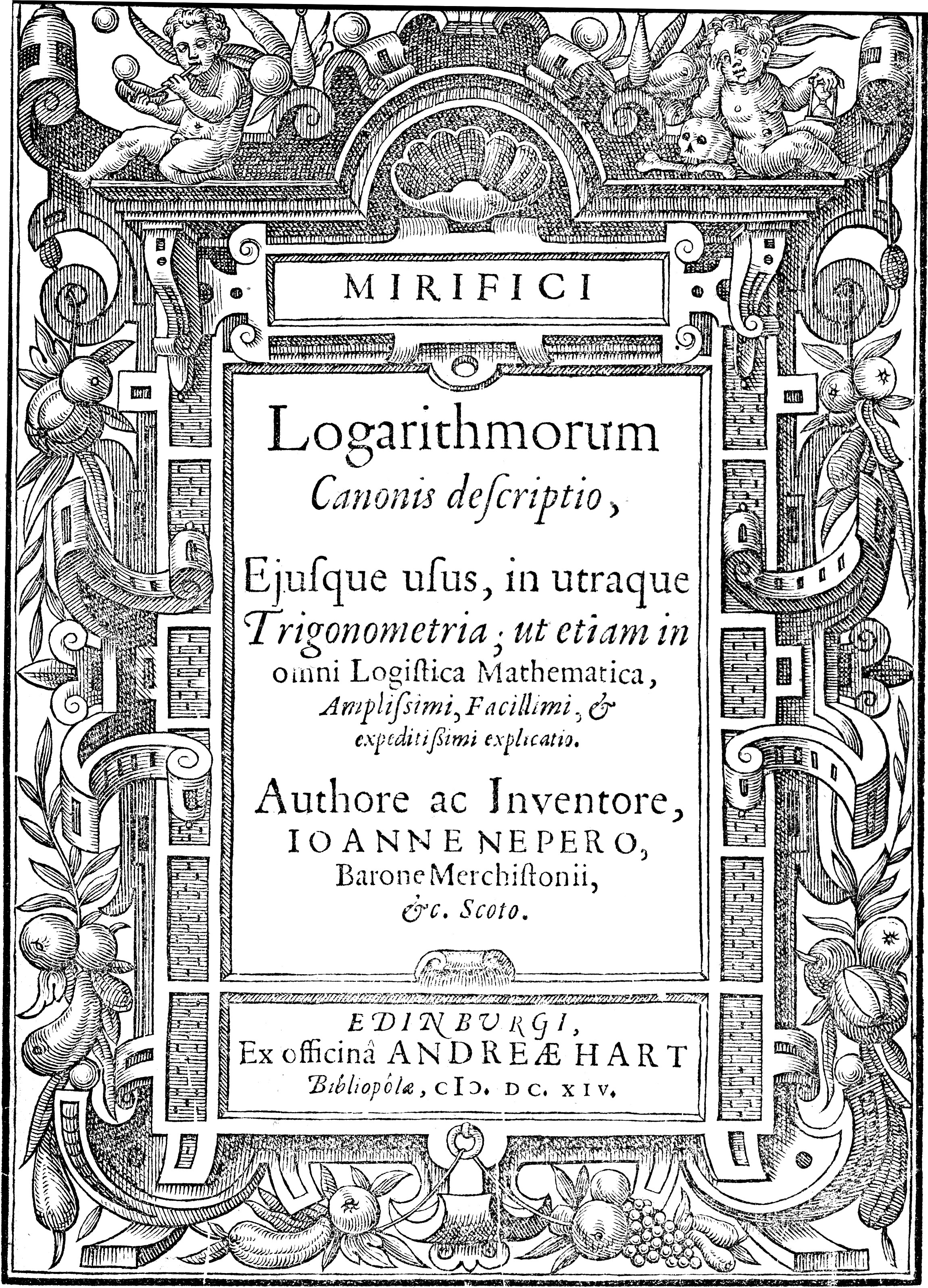
Title page of Napier's 1614 table of logarithms of trigonometric functions Mirifici Logarithmorum Canonis Descriptio

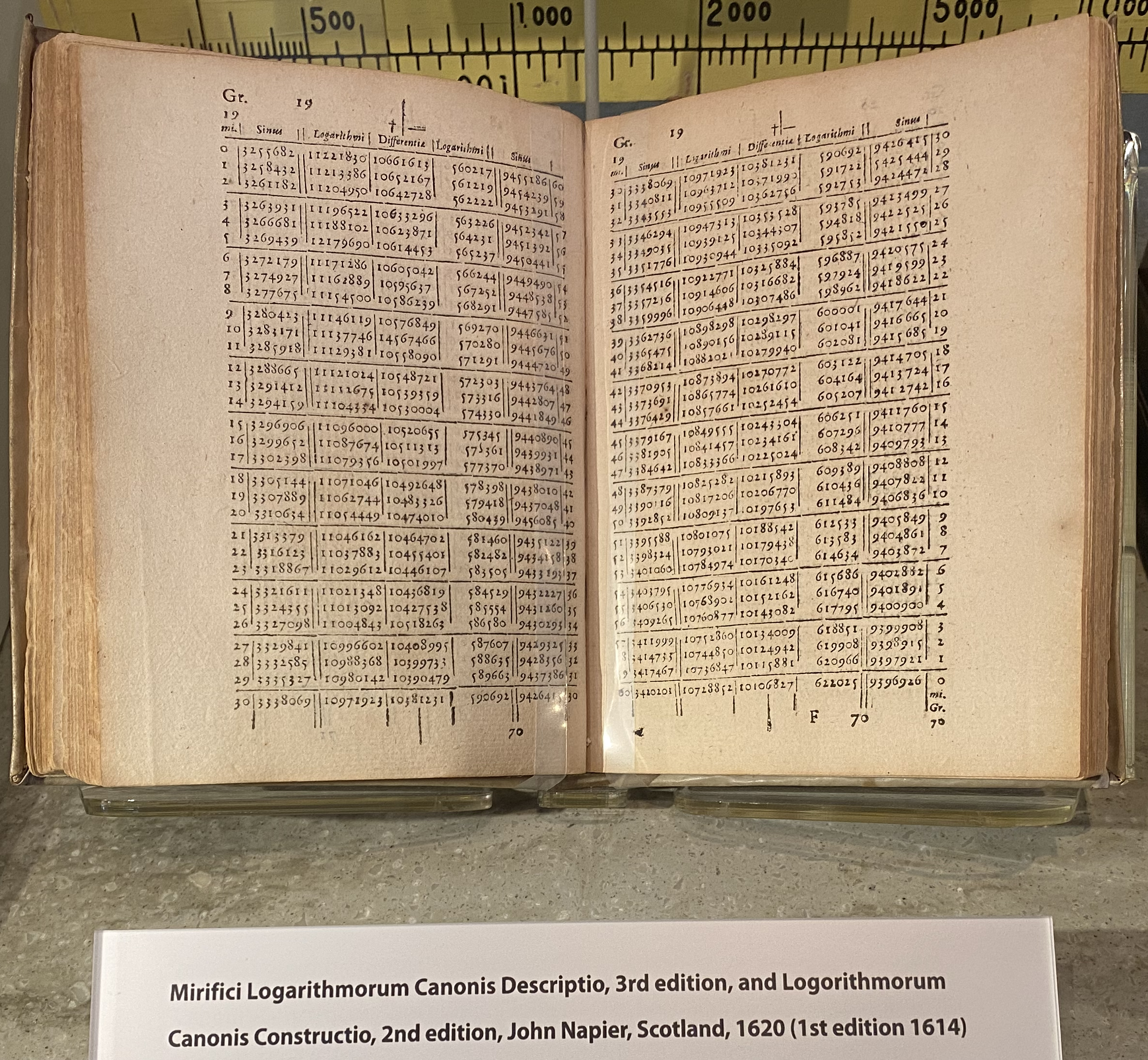
The 19 degree pages from Napier's 1614 table. The left hand page covers angle increments of 0 to 30 minutes, the right hand page 30 to 60 minutes

Mirifici Logarithmorum Canonis Descriptio (Description of the Wonderful Canon of Logarithms, 1614) and Mirifici Logarithmorum Canonis Constructio (Construction of the Wonderful Canon of Logarithms, 1619) are two books in Latin by John Napier expounding the method of logarithms. While others had approached the idea of logarithms, notably Jost Bürgi, it was Napier who first published the concept, along with easily used precomputed tables, in his Mirifici Logarithmorum Canonis Descriptio.

Prior to the introduction of logarithms, high accuracy numerical calculations involving multiplication, division and root extraction were laborious and error prone. Logarithms greatly simplify such calculations. As Napier put it:

“…nothing is more tedious, fellow mathematicians, in the practice of the mathematical arts, than the great delays suffered in the tedium of lengthy multiplications and divisions, the finding of ratios, and in the extraction of square and cube roots… [with] the many slippery errors that can arise…I have found an amazing way of shortening the proceedings [in which]… all the numbers associated with the multiplications, and divisions of numbers, and with the long arduous tasks of extracting square and cube roots are themselves rejected from the work, and in their place other numbers are substituted, which perform the tasks of these rejected by means of addition, subtraction, and division by two or three only.”

The book contains fifty-seven pages of explanatory matter and ninety pages of tables of trigonometric functions and their Napierian logarithms. These tables greatly simplified calculations in spherical trigonometry, which are central to astronomy and celestial navigation and which typically include products of sines, cosines and other functions. Napier describes other uses, such as solving ratio problems, as well.

John Napier spent 20 years calculating the tables. He wrote a separate volume describing how he constructed his tables, but held off publication to see how his first book would be received. John died in 1617. His son, Robert, published his father's book, Mirifici Logarithmorum Canonis Constructio, with additions by Henry Briggs in 1619. The Constructio details how Napier created and used three tables of geometric progressions to facilitate the computation of logarithms of the sine function.

== The tables ==
In Napier's time, decimal notation, as used in Europe, only represented integers. Including a fractional part with a decimal number had been proposed by Simon Stevin but his notation was awkward. The idea of using a period to separate the integer part of a decimal number from the fractional part was first proposed by Napier himself in his Constructio book, Section 5, “In numbers distinguished thus by a period in their midst, whatever is written after the period is a fraction, the denominator of which is unity with as many cyphers after it as there are figures after the period.“ He used the concept to facilitate more accurate computation of the tables, but not in the printed tables themselves. Thus an angle's sine value published in his table is a whole number representing the length of the side opposite that angle in a right triangle with hypotenuse of 10,000,000 units. The logarithm in the table, however, is of that sine value divided by 10,000,000. The logarithm is again presented as an integer with an implied denominator of 10,000,000.

The table consists of 45 pairs of facing pages. Each pair is labeled at the top with an angle, from 0 to 44 degrees, and at the bottom from 90 to 45 degrees. (The 44–45 degree page being a single side.) The first column on each page of the table is an angle increment in minutes, to be added to the degree value at the top of the page. The far right column is minutes to be added to the degree value at the bottom of each page. This arrangement is such that for each line on a page, the full angle represented by column 7 is the co-angle of column 1 (90° – column_1). Moving inward, adjacent to each angle column is the sine of that angle, followed by the absolute value of Napierian log of that sine. One can get log-cosines for column 1 easily by reading across the page to column 5, and vice versa. The middle column shows the difference between the two logs, which is the Napierian log of the tangent function (cotangent if you reverse signs).

The tables can also be used as a table of Napierian logarithms for positive numbers less than one, using the sine values (Columns 2 and 6) as the argument and the log sine values (Columns 3 and 5) as the resulting logarithm. Reversing the procedure gives anti-logarithms.

The first three rows in the table below reproduce the headings and first two data rows of the left-side 19 degree page of Napier's table, see photograph. They are followed by values computed using modern algorithms for the same angles. These are truncated to 8-digit accuracy, one more than the nominal 7-digit accuracy of Napier's table. Column numbers are shown for clarity.

Napier's page (left side) for Gr. 19 (19 degrees)
mi.	Sinus	Logarithmi	Differentie	Logarithmi	Sinus	
0	3255682	11221830	10661613	560217	9455186	60
1	3258432	11213386	10652167	561219	9454239	59
θ	sin(θ)	−ln(sin(θ))	−ln(tan(θ))	−ln(sin(90°-θ))	sin(90° − θ)	90° − θ
19°	0.32556815	1.12218345	1.0661617	0.05602174	0.94551857	71°
19° 1'	0.32584318	1.12133905	1.0652171	0.05612195	0.94542383	70° 59'
Column 1	2	3	4	5	6	7

== The Descriptio text ==
Napier's Descriptio is divided into two books. The first describes his invention and some applications and includes the tables. The second discusses applications to trigonometry.

=== Book I ===
Chapter 1 contains a series of definitions and propositions that explains Napier's conception of logarithms. He conceived logarithms in terms of two models of motion. In the first, a particle starts at a point and moves along a straight line at a constant speed. In the second, a particle moves along a straight line, starting with the same initial speed, but its speed decreases in proportion to its distance from the starting point. The logarithm of a number, a, is then the distance traveled by a particle in the constant speed model, during the time it takes the particle in the second, inverse proportional model to reach a. He defines the logarithm of 10,000,000 to be zero and that the logarithm of values less than that to be positive, while greater numbers have a negative logarithm, a reversal of sign from modern logarithms. (This sign change is sometimes expressed by saying Napier used logarithms with base 1/e.) He notes that he has freedom to choose any value to have a zero log, in modern terms the base, but chooses 10,000,000 for ease of calculation as it matches the "total sine" (the hypotenuse), in his sine tables. See Naperian logarithm.

The second chapter describes the properties of logarithms and give some formulas (in text form) for working with ratios. It ends with a note stating he is delaying publication of his work on constructing logarithms until he sees how his invention is received. Chapter 3 describes the tables and their seven columns, see above. The fourth chapter explains how to use the tables and gives worked examples for sines tangents and secants. He also explains how to get logarithms of numbers directly by using the sine values as the argument and the log-sine values as result and vice versa. He discusses how to deal with different multiples of ten and introduces a notation, similar to modern scientific notation where he appends a number of zeros after the logarithm of a quantity to indicate a need for correction by decades. He give specific logarithm quantities to be added or subtracted in different cases:

- 23025842 + 0 or 46051684 + 00, or 69077527 + 000, or 92103369 + 0000, or 115129211 + 00000

These correspond to 10,000,000*ln(10), 10,000,000*ln(100), etc.

Chapter 5 presents four problems in proportionality and their solution using Napier's logarithms. He concludes by asking "how great a benefit is bestowed by these logarithms : since by the addition of these for multiplication, by subtraction for divisional, by division by two for the extraction of square roots, and by three for cube roots ... all the heavier work of calculation is avoided."

=== Book II ===
Book II deals with "that noble kind of Geometry, that is called Trigonometry." The first chapter deals with using logarithms to solve problems in plane trigonometry with right triangles and, in particular, with small angles, where his trigonometric logarithms become large. The next chapter cover plane oblique triangles. The remaining chapters cover spherical trigonometry, starting with quadrants. He also describes his Pentagramma mirificum, a five-pointed star on the sphere whose angles are all 90 degrees.

== Mirifici Logarithmorum Canonis Constructio ==
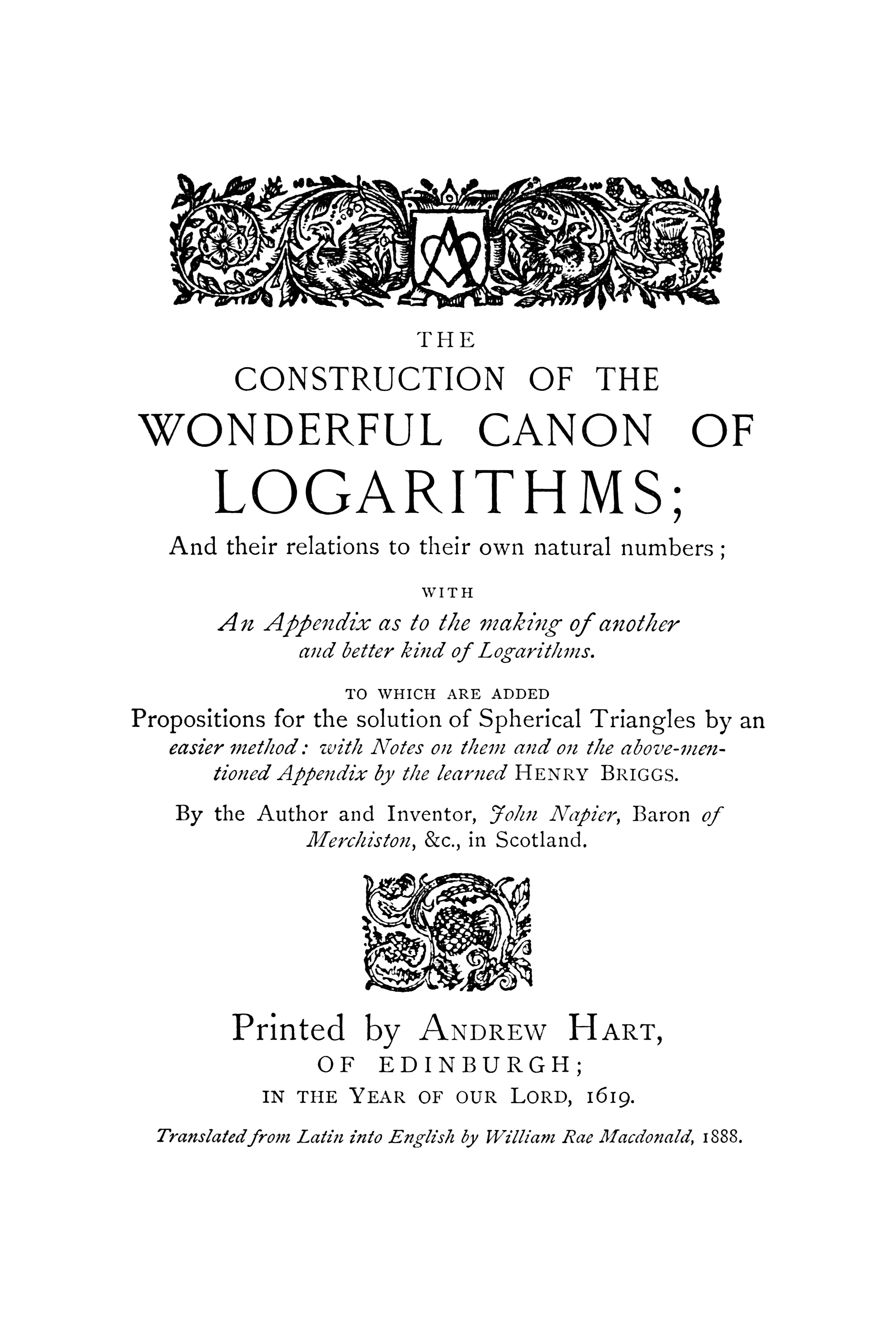
Title page of English translation of Constructio

Napier was reluctant to publish the theory and details of how he created his table of logarithms pending feedback from the mathematics community on his ideas, and he died shortly after publication of the Descriptio. His son Robert published the Constructio in 1619. The volume has a preface by Robert and several appendices, including a section on John Napier's methods for more easily solving spherical triangles, and a section by Henry Biggs on “another and better kind of logarithms,” namely base 10 or common logarithms. An English translation by William Rae Macdonald was published, with annotations, in 1889.

Napier's describes logarithms via a correspondence between two points moving under different speed profiles. The first point, P, moves along a finite line segment P_{0} to Q, with an initial speed that decreases proportional to P's distance to Q. The second point, L, moves along an unbounded line segment starting at L_{0} at the same time as P and with the same initial speed, but maintaining that speed without change. For each possible position of P, measured by its distance from Q, there is a corresponding simultaneous position of L. Napier defined the logarithm of the distance from P to Q to be distance from L_{0} to that L.

=== Computation approach ===
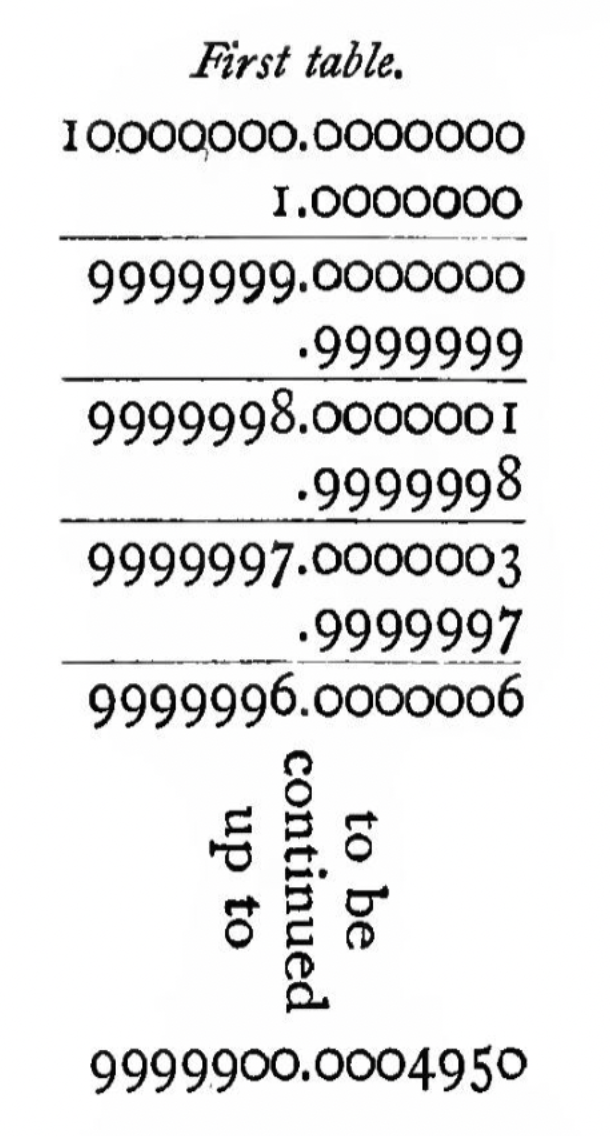
Napier's first auxiliary table, a geometric progression computed by successive subtraction

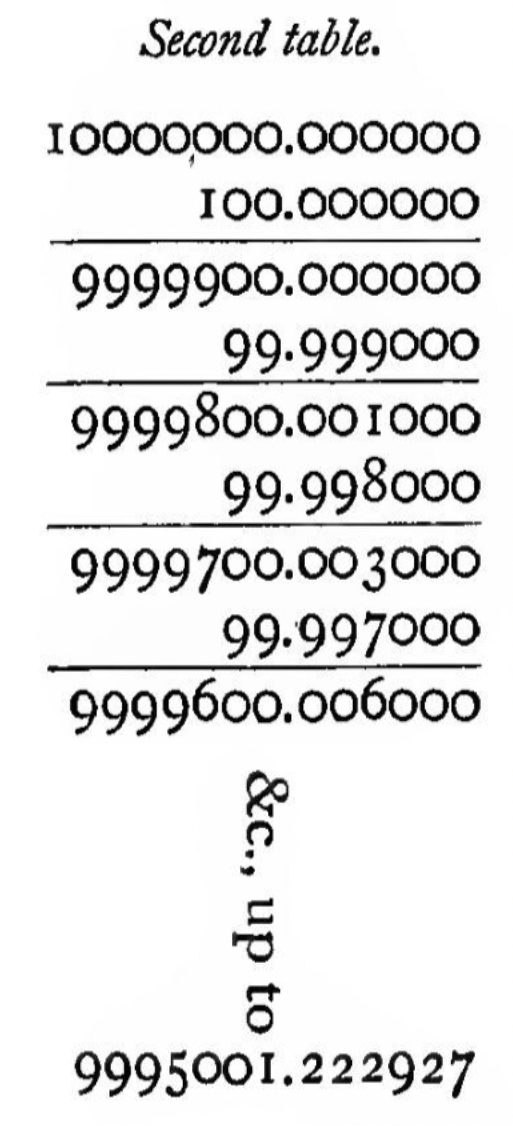
Napier's second auxiliary table. The final value should be 9995001.224804

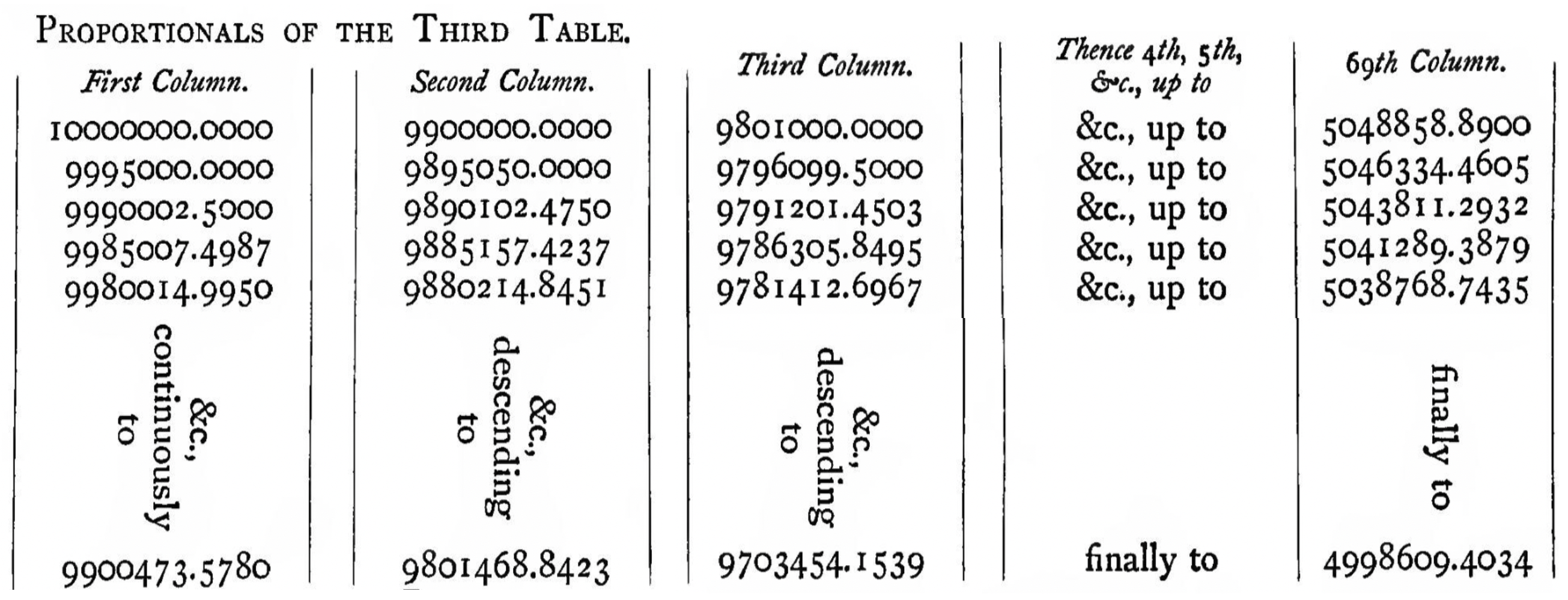
Napier's third "Radical" table

Napier relies on several insights to compute his table of logarithms. To achieve high accuracy he starts with a large base of 10,000,000. But he then gets additional precision by using decimal fractions in a notation that he invented, but now universally familiar, namely using a decimal point. He goes on to explain how his notation works with some examples. He also introduces a form of interval arithmetic to bound any errors that occur in his calculations.

Another now familiar fact he observes is that fractions with denominators that are powers of 10 can be computed easily in decimal notation by shifting the number right relative the decimal point. As he puts it: "We call easy parts of a number, any parts the denominators of which are made up of unity and a number of cyphers, such parts being obtained by rejecting as many of the figures at the end of the principal number as there are cyphers in the denominator."

He notes that arithmetic progressions are easy to calculate since they only involve addition and subtraction but that geometric progressions are, in general, harder to compute because they involve multiplication, division and possibly roots. However he observes that geometric progressions involving multipliers of the form 1 − 1/10^{m} (i.e. of the form 0.99...9, with m nines) can be computed to arbitrary precision using just one shift and one subtraction per stage. Similarly, multipliers of the form 1 − 1/(2*10^{m}) (i.e. 0.99...95) only require one shift, one division by two and one subtraction per stage for full precision, which he calls "tolerably easy."

Napier also observes that logarithms of a geometric progression differ by a constant value at each stage, namely the logarithm of the multiplier. So if one knows the logarithm of the initial value of a geometric progression and of the multiplier, one can compute the logarithm of each member of the progression by repeated addition of the multiplier's logarithm.

=== Calculating first logarithm ===
Using his two line model, Napier finds lower and upper bounds for the logarithm of 0.9999999. His lower bound assumes the point P does not slow down, in which case L will move a distance of 1-0.9999999. His upper bound assumes P started out at its final speed of 0.9999999 in which case L will have moved the distance of (1-0.9999999)/0.9999999. Scaled up by his radius of 10,000,000, the lower bound is 1 and his upper bound is 1.0000001. He suggests that since the difference between these values is tiny, any value between them will present an "insensible error" of less than one part in 10 million, but he chooses, without much explanation, the midpoint, 1.00000005. This choice gives him far greater precision, as his translator, William Rae Macdonald. points out in an appendix, noting that Napier's scaled up value for the logarithm of .9999999 is very close to the correct value, 1.000000050000003333333583..., and that all his subsequent computations of logarithms derive from the 1.00000005 value. Macdonald suggests that Napier must have had a better reason for picking the midpoint.

=== Auxiliary tables ===
Napier uses these insights to construct three tables. The first table, in modern notation, consists of the numbers 10000000*(0.9999999)^{n} for n ranging from 0 to 100. The second consists of the numbers 100000*(0.99999)^{n} for n ranging from 0 to 50. He then applies his value for the log of .9999999 to fill in logarithms for all the entries in his first table. He can use the last entry to compute the log of .99999, since .9999999^{100} is very close to .99999. He then the uses his second table, which is essentially 50 powers of .99999 to compute the logarithm of .9995. Macdonald also points out that an error crept into Napier's calculation of the second table; Napier's fiftieth value is 9995001.222927, but should be 9995001.22480. Macdonald discusses the consequences of this error in his appendix.

=== The radical table ===
Napier then constructs a third table of proportions with 69 columns and 21 rows, which he calls his "radical table." The proportion along the top rows, starting with 1 is 0.99. The entries in each column are in proportion 0.9995. (Note that 0.9995 = 1-1/2000, allowing "tolerably easy" multiplication by halving, shifting and subtracting.) Napier uses the first column to computing the logarithm of .99, using log of .9995, which he already has. He can now fill in the logarithm of each entry in the third table because, by proportionality, the difference in logarithms between entries is constant. The third table now provides logarithms for a set of 1,449 values that cover the range from roughly 5,000,000 to 10,000,000, which corresponds to values of the sine function from 30 to 90 degrees, assuming a radius of 10,000,000. Napier then explains how to use the tables to calculate a bounding interval for logarithms in that range.

=== Constructing the published tables ===
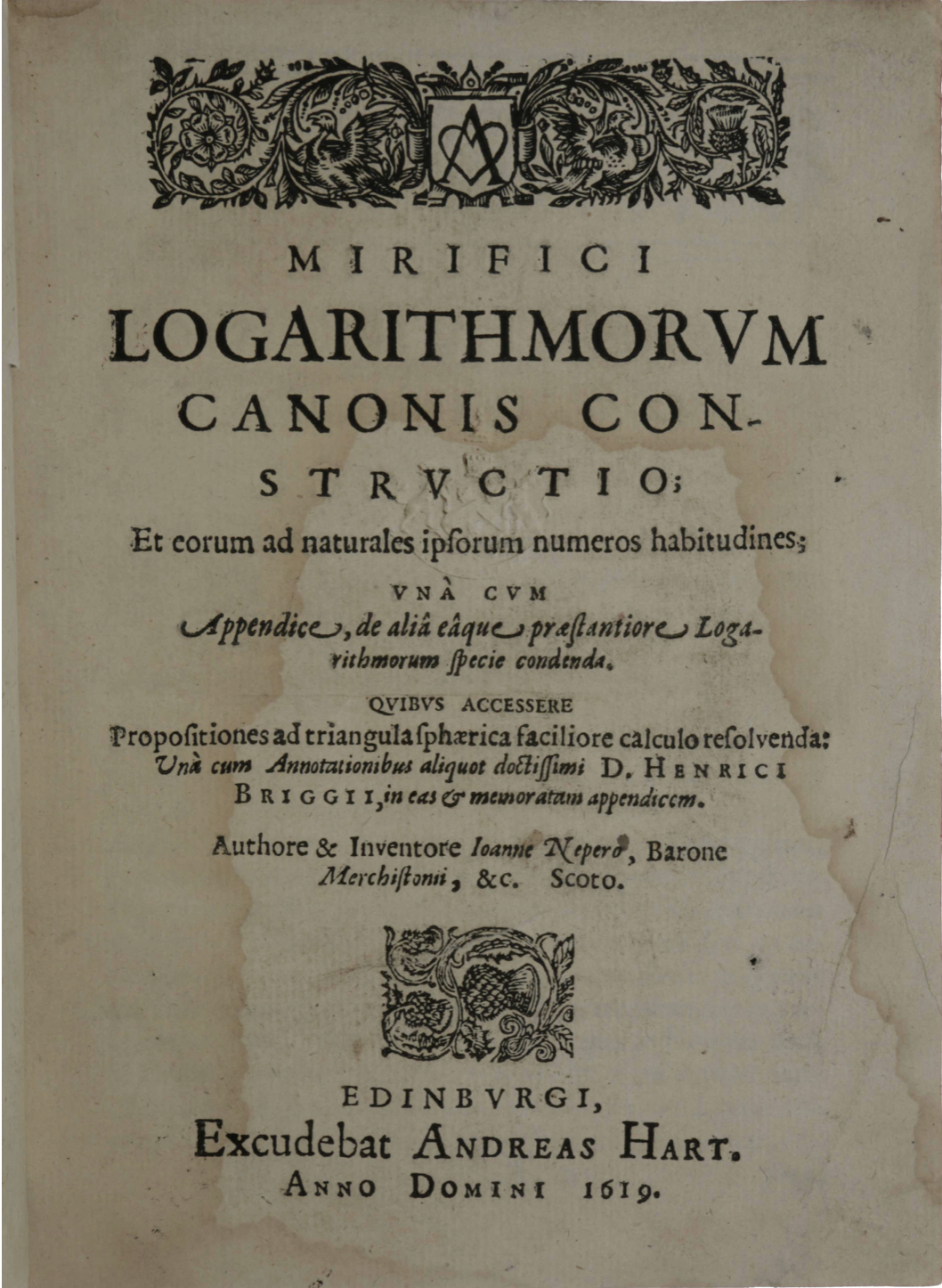
Latin title page of Constructio, 1619

Napier then gives instructions for reproducing his published tables, with their seven columns and coverage of each minute of arc. He does not compute the sines themselves, the values for which are to be filled in from an already available table. "Reinhold's common table of sines, or any other more exact, will supply you with these values." Logarithms of sines for angles from 30 degrees to 90 degrees are then computed by finding the closest number in the radical table and its logarithm and calculating the logarithm of the desired sine by linear interpolation. He suggests several ways for computing logarithms for sines of angles less than 30 degrees. For example, one can multiply a sine that is less than 0.5 by some power of two or ten to bring it into the range [0.5,1]. After finding that logarithm in the radical table, one adds the logarithm of the power of two or ten that was used (he gives a short table), to get the required logarithm.

Napier ends by pointing out that two of his methods for extending his table produce results with small differences. He proposes that others “who perchance may have plenty of pupils and computers” construct a new table with a larger scale factor of 10,000,000,000, by the same methods but using a radical table with only 35 columns, enough to cover angles from 45 to 90 degrees.

=== After matter ===
In an appendix, Napier discusses construction of “another and better kind of logarithm” where the logarithm of one is zero and the logarithm of ten is 10,000,000,000, the index. This is essentially base 10 logarithms with the large scale factor. He discusses various ways to compute such a table and ends by describing the logarithm of 2 as the number of digits in 2^{10,000,000}, which he computes as 301029995. The appendix is followed by remarks Henry Briggs on Napier's concepts and base-10 logarithms. The next section is a 12 page essay by Napier titled “Some very remarkable propositions for the solution of spherical triangles with wonderful ease,” where he describes how to solve them without dividing them into two right triangles. This section is also followed by commentary from Briggs.

The translator, Macdonald, includes some notes at this point, discussing the spelling of Napier's name, references to delays in publishing the second volume, the development of decimal arithmetic, the error in Napiers second table and the accuracy of Napier's method, and methods for computing base-10 logarithms.

The last section is a catalog by Macdonald of Napier's works in public libraries, including religious works, editions in different languages. and other books related to the work of John Napier and logarithms.

== Reception ==
Napier's novel method of calculation spread quickly in Britain and abroad. Kepler dedicated his 1620 Ephereris to Napier, with a letter congratulating him on his invention and its benefits to astronomy. Kepler found no essential errors except for some inaccuracies at small angles. Edward Wright, an authority on celestial navigation, translated Napier's Latin Descriptio into English in 1615, the next year, though publication was delayed by Wright's death. Briggs extended the concept to the more convenient base 10, or common logarithm. Ursinus called Napier "a mathematician without equal." Three hundred years later, in 1914, E. W. Hobson called logarithms "one of the very greatest scientific discoveries that the world has seen."

In 1620 Edmund Gunter developed a ruler with a logarithmic scale; with a pair of dividers it could be used to multiply and divide. In c. 1622, William Oughtred combined two handheld Gunter rules to make a calculating device that was essentially the first slide rule.

The logarithm function became a staple of mathematical analysis, but printed tables of logarithms gradually diminished in importance in the twentieth century as multiplying mechanical calculators and, later, electronic computers took over high accuracy computation needs. The introduction of hand-held scientific calculators in the 1970s ended the era of slide rules. The current, 2002, edition of The American Practical Navigator (Bowditch) still contains tables of logarithms and logarithms of trigonometric functions.

== See also ==
- History of logarithms
- Multiplication sign
