= Alexander John Thompson =

Alexander John Thompson (1885 in Plaistow, Essex – 17 June 1968 in Wallington, Surrey) is the author of the last great table of logarithms, published in 1952. This table, the Logarithmetica britannica gives the logarithms of all numbers from 1 to 100000 to 20 places and supersedes all previous tables of similar scope, in particular the tables of Henry Briggs, Adriaan Vlacq and Gaspard de Prony.

== Publications ==
- Alexander John Thompson: Table of the coefficients of Everett's central-difference interpolation formula, 1921, Cambridge: University Press (2nd edition in 1943)
- Alexander John Thompson: Henry Briggs and His Work on Logarithms, The American Mathematical Monthly, 32(3), March 1925, pp. 129–131
- Alexander John Thompson: Logarithmetica britannica [Texte imprimé] : being a standard table of logarithms to twenty decimal places of the numbers 10,000 to 100,000, 2 volumes, 1952, Cambridge: University Press, reprinted in 1967, formerly issued in 9 parts:
  - Alexander John Thompson: Logarithmetica britannica, being a standard table of logarithms to twenty decimal places. Part I, Numbers 10,000 to 20,000, 1934, Cambridge: University Press
  - Alexander John Thompson: Logarithmetica britannica, being a standard table of logarithms to twenty decimal places. Part II, Numbers 20,000 to 30,000, 1952, Cambridge: University Press
  - Alexander John Thompson: Logarithmetica britannica, being a standard table of logarithms to twenty decimal places. Part III, Numbers 30,000 to 40,000, 1937, Cambridge: University Press
  - Alexander John Thompson: Logarithmetica britannica, being a standard table of logarithms to twenty decimal places. Part IV, Numbers 40,000 to 50,000, 1928, Cambridge: University Press
  - Alexander John Thompson: Logarithmetica britannica, being a standard table of logarithms to twenty decimal places. Part V, Numbers 50,000 to 60,000, 1931, Cambridge: University Press
  - Alexander John Thompson: Logarithmetica britannica, being a standard table of logarithms to twenty decimal places. Part VI, Numbers 60,000 to 70,000, 1933, Cambridge: University Press
  - Alexander John Thompson: Logarithmetica britannica, being a standard table of logarithms to twenty decimal places. Part VII, Numbers 70,000 to 80,000, 1935, Cambridge: University Press
  - Alexander John Thompson: Logarithmetica britannica, being a standard table of logarithms to twenty decimal places. Part VIII, Numbers 80,000 to 90,000, 1927, Cambridge: University Press
  - Alexander John Thompson: Logarithmetica britannica, being a standard table of logarithms to twenty decimal places. Part IX, Numbers 90,000 to 100,000, 1924, Cambridge: University Press
- There is apparently a Russian translation, Logarifmy čisel ot 10000 do 55000, Logarifmy čisel ot 55000 do 100000, published in Moscow in 1961 and again in 1972
