= Euclid Speidell =

Euclid Speidell (died 1702) was an English customs official and mathematics teacher known for his writing on logarithms. Speidell published revised and expanded versions of texts by his father, John Speidell. He also published a book called Logarithmotechnia, or, The making of numbers called logarithms to twenty five places from a geometrical figure in 1688.

Speidell lived in Angel Alley in the 1680s and 1690s, according to the Survey of London.

Speidell's name appears on an instrument made by his contemporary Henry Sutton.
