= Todd H. Speidell =

Dr. Todd H. Speidell (born 31 July 1957) is a retired educator, theologian, and ethicist. He continues his work as Editor of Participatio: Journal of the Thomas F. Torrance Theological Fellowship and General Editor of The Ray S. Anderson Collection (Wipf and Stock Publishers). His most recent positions were as Lecturer in Theology at Montreat College, Director of Education at The Village Academy of Village Behavioral Health (in Louisville, TN), and Director of College Prep Academy of West Knoxville (in Knoxville, Tennessee).

Born in Chicago, Illinois, he is the second child of Rev. Henry and Ruth Speidell, who raised him in Paterson, New Jersey, and is a relative of Gen. Dr. Hans Speidel. He earned his B.A. in Psychology from Gordon College in 1975, and his M.Div. and Ph.D. degrees from Fuller Theological Seminary in 1983 and 1986 respectively. His theological mentors were Ray S. Anderson, Geoffrey W. Bromiley, and J.B. and T.F. Torrance.

He has served as professor, chaplain, or administrator at University of California at Los Angeles, American Baptist Seminary of the West, Fuller Theological Seminary, Knoxville College, Webb School of Knoxville, Tennessee Wesleyan College, College Prep Academy of West Knoxville, The Village Academy, and Montreat College.

== Bibliography ==
Editor:

Editor, Participatio: The Journal of the Thomas F. Torrance Theological Fellowship (2008–present).

Co-editor, Soren Kierkegaard: Theologian of the Gospel (Eugene, OR: Wipf & Stock, 2021)

Editor, Trinity and Transformation: J.B. Torrance's Vision of Worship, Mission, and Society (Eugene, OR: Wipf & Stock, 2016).

Co-editor, T. F. Torrance and Eastern Orthodoxy: Theology in Reconciliation (Eugene, OR: Wipf & Stock, 2015).

Co-editor and Contributor, Incarnational Ministry: The Presence of Christ in Church, Society, and Family (Eugene, OR: Wipf & Stock, 2009)

Guest Editor, Edification: Journal of the Society for Christian Psychology (2007).

Editor and Contributor, On Being Christian... and Human (Eugene, OR: Wipf & Stock, 2002).

Co-editor and Contributor, Incarnational Ministry: The Presence of Christ in Church, Society, and Family (Eugene, OR: Wipf & Stock, 2009)

Books:

Fully Human in Christ: The Incarnation as the End of Ethics (Eugene, OR: Wipf & Stock, 2016)

On Hearing the Truth: An Epistemology of the Ear in a Postmodern World (Eugene, OR: Wipf & Stock, 2006).

Confessions of a Lapsed Skeptic: Acknowledging the Mystery and Manner of God (Eugene, OR: Wipf & Stock, 1999).

From Conduct to Character: A Primer in Ethical Theory (Eugene, OR: Wipf & Stock, 1998).

Articles:

"Philosophical Synchronicity: The Dialectic of Objectivity and Subjectivity in Jung and Polanyi" (co-written, Personality Type in Depth, April 20, 2023)

“The Soteriological Suspension of Ethics in the Theology of T. F. Torrance” (Participatio 2015).

“What Scientists Get, and Theologians Don't, About Thomas F. Torrance” (First Things, June 26, 2013).

“Ray S. Anderson's Doctrine of Humanity as a Contribution to a Theology of Culture: A Case Study Approach” (Cultural Encounters, 2011).

"God, Woody Allen, and Job." Christian Scholar's Review XXIX:3 (Spring. 2000): 551–561.

"A Trinitarian Ontology of Persons in Society." Scottish Journal of Theology Volume 47 No. 3 (1994): 283–300.

"The Incarnation as the Hermeneutical Criterion for Liberation and Reconciliation." Scottish Journal of Theology Volume 47 No. 2 (1987): 249–258.
