= Napierian logarithm =

Mathematical function

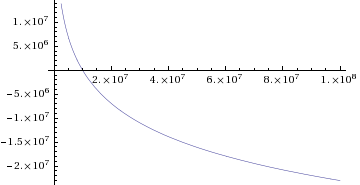
A plot of the Napierian logarithm for inputs between 0 and 10^{8}.

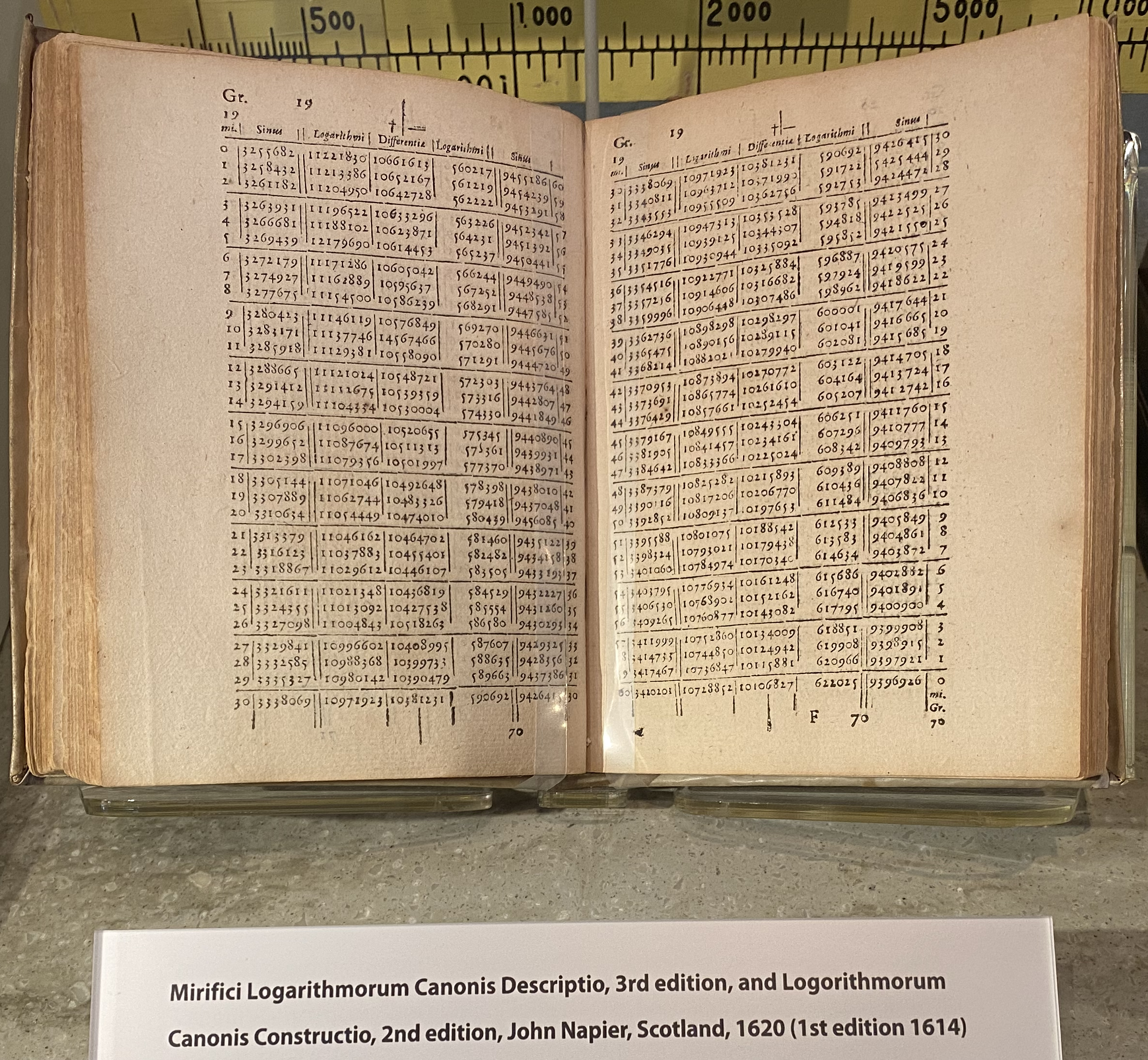
The 19 degree pages from Napier's 1614 table of logarithms of trigonometric functions Mirifici Logarithmorum Canonis Descriptio

The term Napierian logarithm or Naperian logarithm, named after the Scottish mathematician John Napier (1550–1617), is often used to mean the natural logarithm, although this usage is a historical misnomer. Napier's 1614 definition relied on kinematics and distance ratios rather than exponents, and he possessed no knowledge of the constant $e$. The natural logarithm was later discovered through geometry by Grégoire de Saint-Vincent in 1647, who identified it as the area under the hyperbola. The term logarithmus naturalis was subsequently introduced by Nicholas Mercator in his 1668 work Logarithmotechnia. However, if the term is taken to mean the "logarithms" as originally produced by Napier, it is a function given by (in terms of the modern natural logarithm):
$$\operatorname{NapLog}(x) = -10^7 \ln \left(x/10^7\right)$$
It is evident from this formula that Napier's logarithms are not the same as the natural logarithms.

The Napierian logarithm satisfies identities quite similar to the modern logarithm, such as
$$\operatorname{NapLog}(xy) \approx \operatorname{NapLog}(x)+\operatorname{NapLog}(y)-161180956$$
or
$$\operatorname{NapLog}\left(xy/10^7\right) =  \operatorname{NapLog}(x)+\operatorname{NapLog}(y)$$

In Napier's 1614 Mirifici Logarithmorum Canonis Descriptio, he provides tables of logarithms of sines for 0 to 90°, where the values given (columns 3 and 5) are
$$\operatorname{NapLog}(\theta) = -10^7 \ln (\sin(\theta))$$

== Properties ==
Napier's "logarithm" is related to the natural logarithm by the relation
$$\operatorname{NapLog} (x) \approx 10000000 (16.11809565 - \ln x)$$
and to the common logarithm by
$$\operatorname{NapLog} (x) \approx 23025851 (7 - \log_{10} x).$$

Note that
$$16.11809565 \approx 7 \ln \left(10\right)$$
and
$$23025851 \approx 10^7 \ln (10).$$

Napierian logarithms are essentially natural logarithms with decimal points shifted 7 places rightward and with sign reversed. For instance the logarithmic values
$$\ln(.5000000) = -0.6931471806$$
$$\ln(.3333333) = -1.0986123887$$
would have the corresponding Napierian logarithms:
$$\operatorname{NapLog}(5000000) = 6931472$$
$$\operatorname{NapLog}(3333333) = 10986124$$

For further detail, see history of logarithms.
