= John Speidell =

John Speidell (fl. 1600–1634) was an English mathematician. He is known for his early work on the calculation of logarithms.

Speidell was a mathematics teacher in London and one of the early followers of the work John Napier had previously done on natural logarithms. In 1619 Speidell published a table entitled "New Logarithmes" in which he calculated the natural logarithms of sines, tangents, and secants.

He then diverged from Napier's methods in order to ensure all of the logarithms were positive. A new edition of "New Logarithmes" was published in 1622 and contained an appendix with the natural logarithms of all numbers 1-1000.

Along with William Oughtred and Richard Norwood, Speidell helped push toward the abbreviations of trigonometric functions.

Speidel published a number of work about mathematics, including An Arithmeticall Extraction in 1628. His son, Euclid Speidell, also published mathematics texts.
