= Adriaan Vlacq =

Dutch book publisher and author

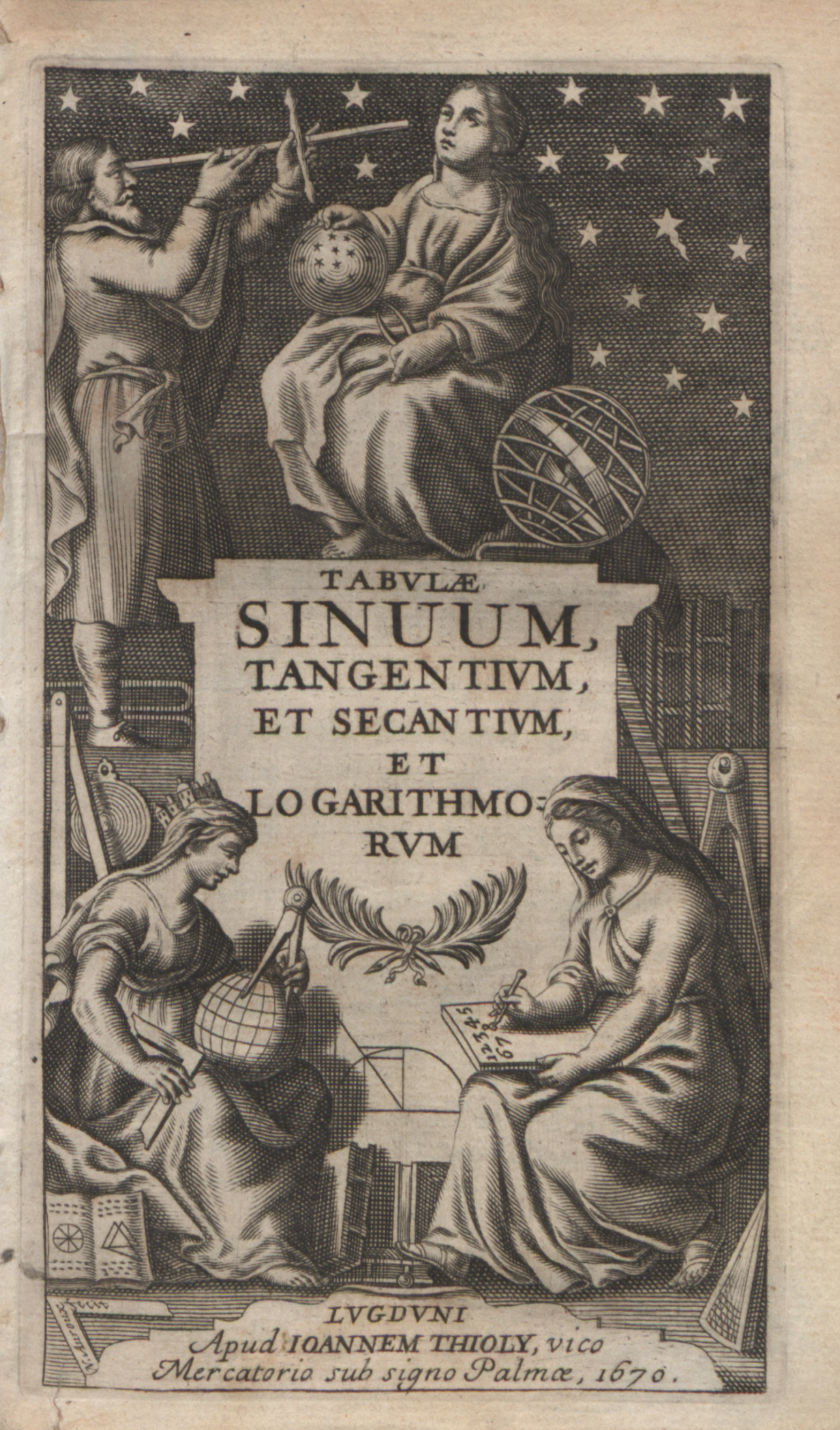
Tabulae, 1670

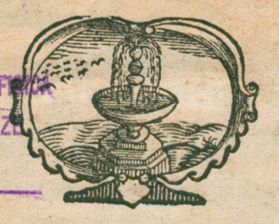
Vlacq's mark (from BEIC)

Adriaan Vlacq (1600–1667) was a Dutch book publisher and author of mathematical tables. Born in Gouda, Vlacq published a table of logarithms from 1 to 100,000 to 10 decimal places in 1628 in his Arithmetica logarithmica. This table extended Henry Briggs' original tables which only covered the values 1-20,000 and 90,001 to 100,000. The new table was computed by Ezechiel de Decker and Vlacq who calculated and added 70,000 further values to complete the tables. This table was further extended by Jurij Vega in 1794, and by Alexander John Thompson in 1952.

A shorter trigonometric table called Canon Sinuum was included in later works of Vlacq.

In 1632, he settled in London but ten years later with the onset of the English Civil War, he moved to Paris and later moved to The Hague.

He died at The Hague on 8 April 1667.

The crater Vlacq on the Moon is named after him.

== See also ==
- Common logarithm
- e (mathematical constant)
- John Napier
