= Greatorex =

Greatorex may refer to:

- Clement Greatorex (1869–1937), Royal Navy admiral
- Eleanor Greatorex (1853–1908), American painter and illustrator
- Eliza Pratt Greatorex (1819–1897), American artist
- Henry Wellington Greatorex (1816–1858), English-American composer
- Jonathan Greatorex (born 1970), English music educator and consumer advocate
- Ken Greatorex (born 1936), English rugby league footballer
- Louis Greatorex (born 1996), English actor
- Ralph Greatorex (c.1625–1675), English mathematical instrument maker
- Ted Greatorex (1901–1964), Australian rugby union player
- Theophilus Greatorex (1864–1933), English cricketer
- Thomas Greatorex (1758–1831), English composer, astronomer and mathematician
- Valentine Greatrakes or Greatorex (1628–1683), Irish faith healer
- Walter Greatorex (1877–1949), English composer
- Wilfred Greatorex (1922–2002), English television and film writer

== See also ==
- Greatrex
- Greatrakes
- Electoral division of Greatorex, Northern Territory, Australia
