= Greatrex =

Greatrex is a surname, shared by:

- John Greatrex (born 1936), English cricketer
- Ken Greatrex, English footballer
- Neil Greatrex (1951–2019), British miners' union president
- Richard Greatrex (b. 1947), British cinematographer
- Stan Greatrex (1911–1986), motorcycle speedway rider in the 1930s
- Tim Greatrex, British television executive
- Tom Greatrex (born 1974), British Labour Party politician

== See also ==
- Greatrex Newman (1892–1984), English author, songwriter and screenwriter
- Greatorex
- Greatrakes
