= Charles de Eendero =

17th-century Flemish engineer

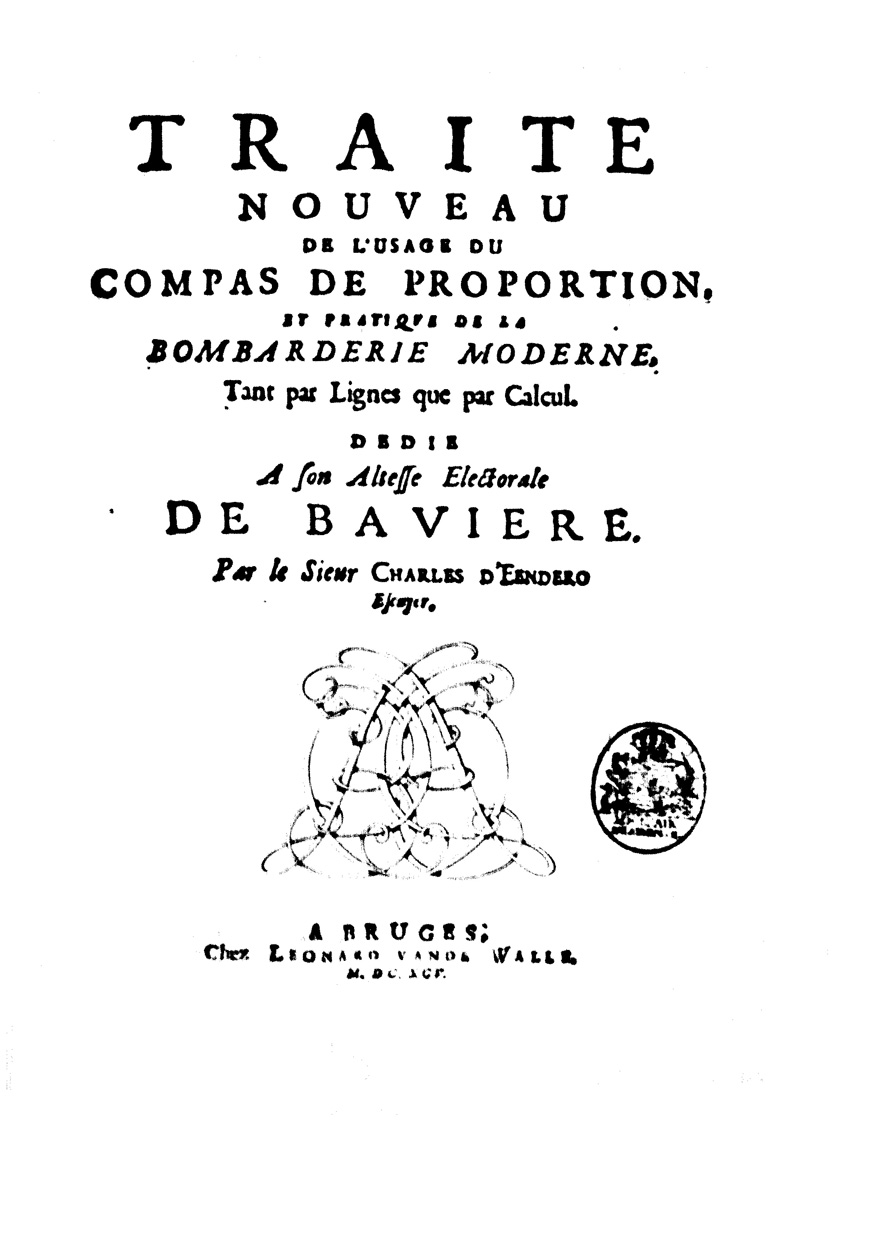
Traité nouveau de l'usage du compas de proportion, title page

Charles de Eendero (or d'Eendero; or Carolus van Eendero) was a 17th-century Flemish engineer.

A nobleman from Bruges, d'Eendero wrote the Traité nouveau de l'usage du compas de proportion, et pratique de la bombarderie moderne, an illustrated treatise, published in 1695 in his hometown; the first part concerns the use of the proportional compass, the second is a dissertation on ballistics, a research on the shooting force of the cannon used up to the 19th century by French artillery.

== Works ==
- Traité nouveau de l'usage du compas de proportion, et pratique de la bombarderie moderne (in French). Bruges: Lenaert vande Walle. 1695.
