= Charles Whitwell =

Charles Whitwell (c. 1568 1611) was an English copper engraver and maker of mathematical and scientific instruments in the tradition of Humphrey Cole (c. 1530 1591).

Whitwell was a citizen of London and a freeman of the Worshipful Company of Grocers. One of his apprentices (indentured 1602) was Elias Allen (c. 1588-1653), who made instruments for royal patrons and for the mathematicians Edmund Gunter and William Oughtred. In 1598 Whitwell's premisses were "withoute Temple Barre against St Clement's church", where he could supply the instrument called a Sector, as described by the mathematician Thomas Hood in his publication of that year.

Active between 1591 and 1606, Whitwell engraved maps of English counties, notably Philip Symonson's New Description of Kent (of 1596), and another of Surrey. He also engraved significant maps of France and of Asia.

Whitwell built many of the instruments invented by the explorer Robert Dudley (1573 1649). These instruments, brought to Florence by Robert Dudley himself, were bequeathed to Ferdinand II de' Medici (1610 1670), and are now in the possession of the Museo Galileo of Florence.
