= William Wotherspoon =

William Wotherspoon may refer to:

- William Wotherspoon (rugby union) (1868-1942), Scottish rugby union international
- William Wallace Wotherspoon (1850-1921), Chief of Staff of the U.S. Army
- William Wallace Wotherspoon (painter) (1821-1888), American landscape painter
