= Greatrakes =

Greatrakes is a surname. Notable people with the surname include:

- Valentine Greatrakes (1628–1683), Irish faith healer
- William Greatrakes (1723?–1781), Irish barrister

== See also ==
- Greatorex
- Greatrex
