= Petruccio Ubaldini =

Italian painter

Petruccio Ubaldini (c.1524 – c.1600) was an Italian (Tuscan) mercenary soldier for Henry VIII (1545–47) and in Edward VI's Scottish war (1549) a calligraphist and illuminator on vellum, who was working in England in the reign of Queen Elizabeth I, and seems to have enjoyed the favor of the Court. One of his illuminated books, presented by him to Elizabeth, is in the Bodleian Library, and Walpole gives a list of other works, formerly in the King's Library, and now mostly in the British Museum. He was also an author and dedicated his Description of Scotland and the Islands to Sir Christopher Hatton.

== Life ==
He was born in Tuscany, about 1524. Ubaldini was first a soldier. He came to England in 1545, entered the service of the crown, and was employed on the continent in some capacity which took him back to Italy. He returned to England in the reign of Edward VI and described the King and court in 1551: Edward VI dressed richly in red, white, and violet, his clothes embroidered with gold, silver and pearls, but with less expense than Henry VIII. Servants wore green and yellow Tudor livery. Aristocratic English women wore French hoods, other wore caps of wool or fur.

Ubaldini saw service in the Scottish war under James Croft, governor of Haddington. He fought for England against the Scots at Siege of Haddington in 1548 during the war of the Rough Wooing. By coincidence, there was another Ubaldini; Migliorino, in Scotland fighting for the other side.

Ubaldini then spent time in Venice. Ten years later he settled in England, where he found a patron in Henry Fitzalan, 12th Earl of Arundel, who presented him at court. He taught Italian, transcribed and illuminated manuscripts, rhymed, and wrote or translated into Italian historical and other tracts. Ubaldini was employed to translate speeches for court masques. In 1578–9, though in receipt of a pension, he was saved from arrest for debt only by the intervention of the privy council.

Ubaldini compiled an account, now lost, of the repulse of the Spanish-Italian invasion of County Kerry in 1580 (see Siege of Smerwick). He rendered into Italian in 1588 the narrative of the defeat of the Spanish Armada compiled for Lord Howard of Effingham, Commentario del successo dell' Armata Spagnola nell' assalir l'Inghilterra l'anno 1588. A free translation, as A Discourse concerning the Spanish Fleet, was made by Augustine Ryther.

In 1597 he visited the workshop of Emery Molyneux who made globes and other instruments in Lambeth, just outside the City of London. He provided an account of his interactions with Molyneux there, both as regards the construction of globes and Molyneux's plans to sell these high quality items across Europe.

== Works ==
- La Vita Di Carlo Magno Imperadore (Life of Charles V), John Wolf, (1581)
- Descrittione del Regno di Scotia et delve Isole sue Adjacente (Description of Scotland and the Islands), Antwerp, (1588)
- Coventry, Andrew, ed., Descrittione del Regno di Scotia et delve Isole sue Adjacente, Bannatyne Club (1829)
