= Elias Allen =

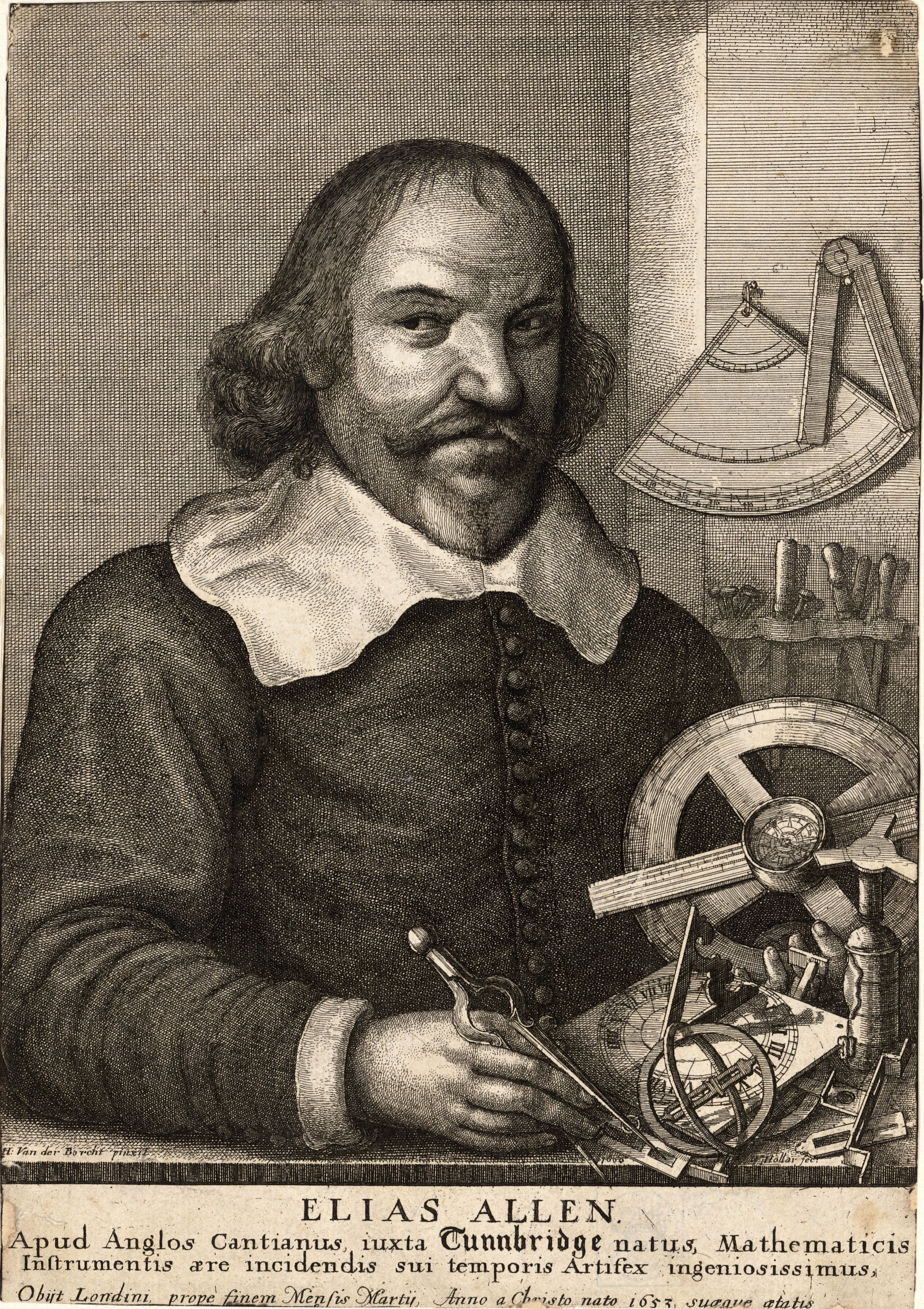
A 1653 engraving of Elias Allen by Wenceslas Hollar

Elias Allen (c.1588 in Tonbridge – March 1653 in London) was an English maker of sundials and scientific instruments.

Allen was apprenticed in 1602 to Charles Whitwell, the London copper engraver, instrument maker and clockmaker, citizen of the Worshipful Company of Grocers, whose premisses were just outside Temple Bar, London, near St Clement Danes Church. After his master died, Allen established himself in a workshop beside the church there. He made instruments for James I and Charles I, among others, and was associated with the mathematicians Edmund Gunter and William Oughtred. His apprentices included Ralph Greatorex. He served from 19 January 1637 until 29 July 1638 as Master of the London Clockmakers' Company. He died in March 1653 and was buried in St Clement Danes.

In 1638 William Oughtred wrote a letter to Allen asking him to make the earliest known Oughtred slide rule, and indicating that Oughtred himself had never made one. Oughtred writes, "I have here sent you directions (as you requested me being at Twickenham) about the making of the two rulers. [...] I would gladly see one of them when it is finished, which yet I never have done." The instrument does not survive, but there is a reverse print of it.

== Disambiguation ==
A well-established surveyor of the same name was active during the same period. In June 1623 (for example) a certain Elias Allen produced surveyed plans (at 20 perches to the inch) of the estates at Malden and Chessington in Surrey, including Mott's Furze Farm, for the muniments of Merton College, University of Oxford; in 1629 he produced a further survey of their lands at Thorncroft in Leatherhead. In recent scholarship he is usually taken to be a different person from the instrument maker, and his life-dates are given as slightly earlier (viz.: born c. 1575, died before 1637).
