= Augustine Ryther =

English engraver and translator

Augustine Ryther (died 1593) was an English engraver and translator. He engraved some of Christopher Saxton's maps of English counties. He also made scientific instruments.

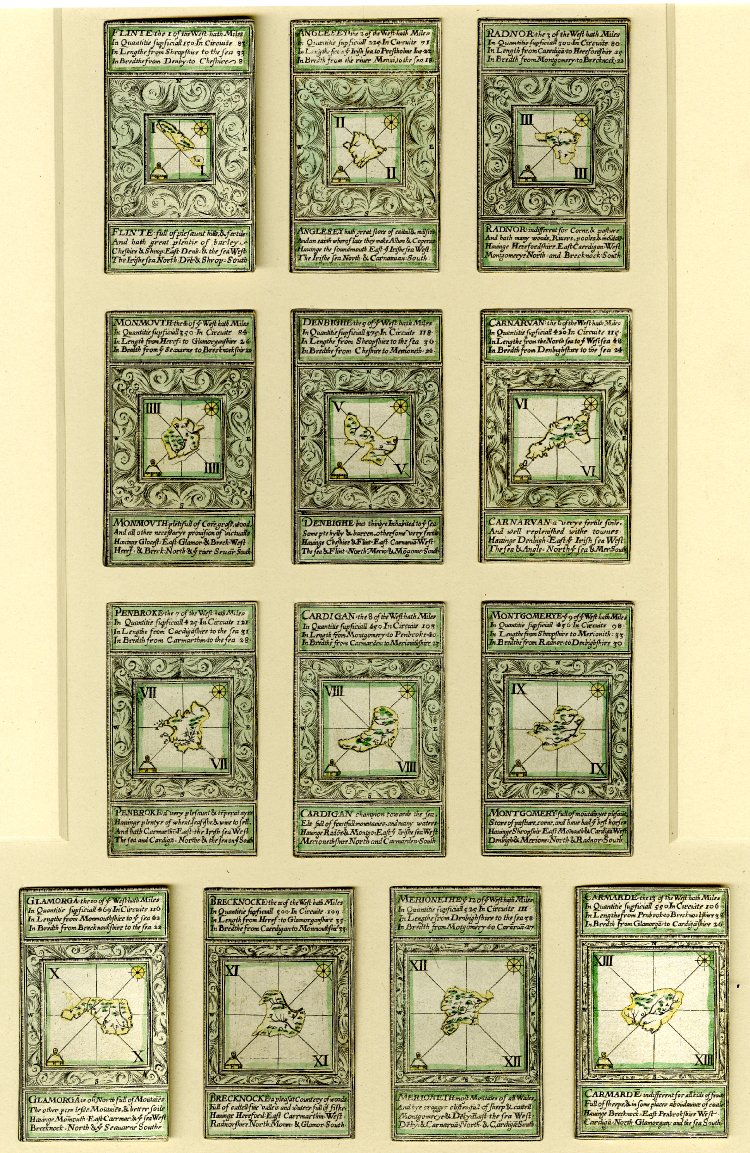
Cards from a 1590 pack illustrating counties of England and Wales, with maps largely copied from an atlas by Christopher Saxton. Engraving by Augustine Ryther, after William Bowes.

== Works ==
Ryther was associated with engraving maps of the counties of England published by Saxton in 1579. His name appears as the engraver of the maps of County Durham and Westmoreland (1576), Gloucester and York (1577), and that of the whole of England, signed ‘Augustinus Ryther Anglus Sculpsit Ano Dñi 1579.’ His name appears in 1588 with those of Jodocus Hondius, Theodore de Bry, and others, among the engravers of the charts to The Mariner's Mirrour by Sir Anthony Ashley.

In 1590 Ryther published a translation of Petruccio Ubaldini's Expeditionis Hispaniorum in Angliam vera Descriptio. The book was printed by A. Hatfield. This work is dedicated by Ryther to Lord Howard of Effingham, and in the dedication he apologises for the two years' delay in its publication. The plates consist of a title and ten charts, showing the various stages of the progress and defeat of the Spanish Armada in the English Channel, and tracing its further course round the British Isles. They were drawn apparently by Robert Adams, surveyor of the queen's buildings, and form a major record of the Armada. It is probable that Ryther's charts, or Adams's original drawings, were the basis for tapestries of the Spanish Armada, executed by Hendrik Cornelisz Vroom in Holland, and formerly in the House of Lords. Reduced copies of Ryther's charts were published by John Pine in his work on the Armada tapestries. The tables were published by Ryther separately.

Ryther also collaborated with Thomas Hood.
