= Kathleen Honora Greatorex =

American painter and illustrator

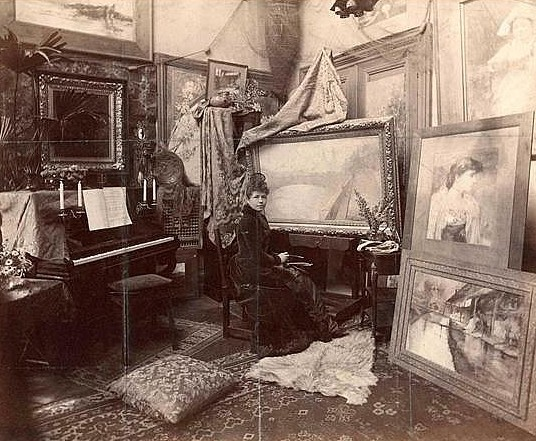
- Born: Kathleen Honora Greatorex; September 10, 1851; Hoboken, New Jersey, U.S.
- Died: May 6, 1942 (aged 90); Moret-sur-Loing, France
- Known for: Painting

Kathleen Honora Greatorex (September 10, 1851 — May 6, 1942) American painter and illustrator born in Hoboken, New Jersey, known for her still life and flower paintings. She lived in France for many years.

== Early years ==
Her mother, Eliza Pratt Greatorex was a well known painter and printmaker associated with the Hudson River School while her father, Henry Wellington Greatorex, was a respected musician. Throughout her career she worked closely with her mother and sister. Following the murder of her brother, Thomas Anthony Greatorex, in Colorado in 1881, the Greatorex women left New York City and moved to Moret-sur-Loing, in the Île-de-France.

Greatorex began her art studies with her mother before moving to Paris where she studies with Jean-Jacques Henner and then to Germany to study at the Munich Pinakothek. She continued her studies in Rome.

== Career ==
Greatorex showed at least three pieces at the 1893 World's Columbian Exposition in Chicago.

During the final years of his life, noted Impressionist painter Alfred Sisley, resident of Moret-sur-Loing developed a close friendship with Kathleen Greatorex. Following the death of her sister Eleanor Elizabeth Greatorex (1854–1908), Greatorex sold a portion of her property to American art-dealer and critic Sarah Tyson Hallowell, whose niece Harriett Hallowell was named as Kathleen's sole heir when Greatorex died of old age on May 6, 1942 in Moret-sur-Loing.

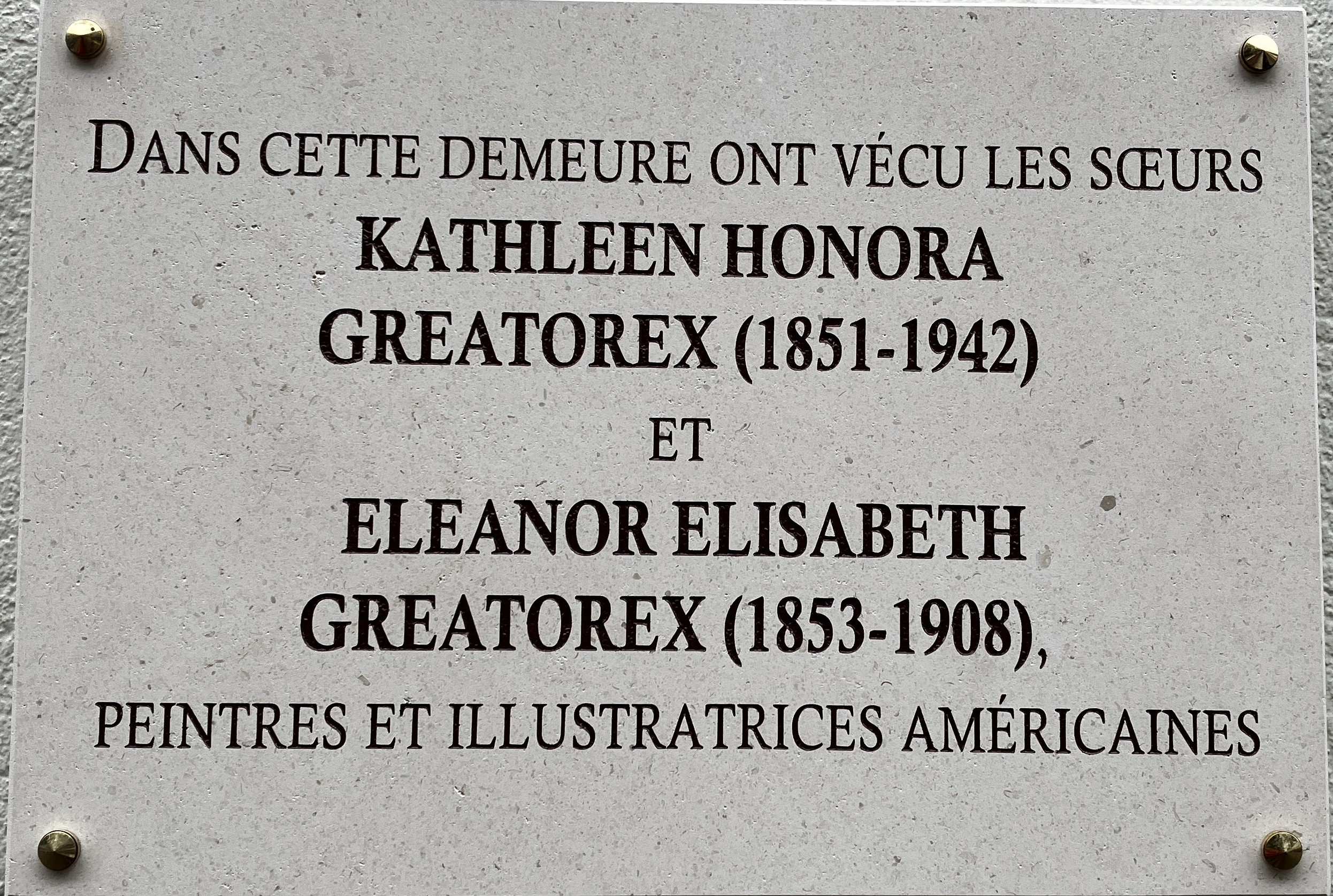
Greatorex

The life and work of Kathleen Honora Greatorex is discussed by Dr. Katherine Manthorne in Restless Enterprise: The Life and Art of Eliza Pratt Greatorex. University of California Press. 2020

Greatorex’s work as a still life painter is discussed by art historians Gerdts and Burke in their book American Still Life Painting (1971)

== Collections ==
Greatorex’s works can be found in many private collections, as well as:

- Raydon Gallery, New York City, New York
- Sotheby Parke Bernet, New York City
- Marbella Gallery New York

== Gallery ==
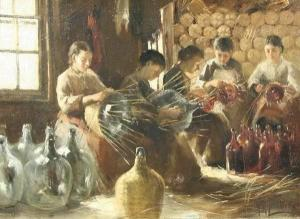
Straw Weavers of Ellenville

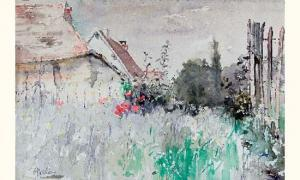
The Flower Garden

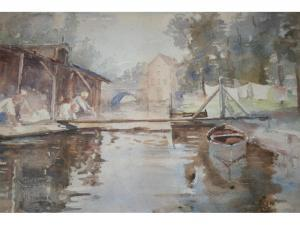
Washerwomen, 1886
