= Henry Wellington Greatorex =

English-American musician, composer and music teacher (1813–1858)

- Born: 1813; Burton upon Trent, Staffordshire, England
- Died: September 1858 (age 44–45); Charleston, South Carolina, U.S.
- Occupations: Organist; singer; composer; music teacher; choir conductor
- Style: Classical; liturgical
- Spouse: Eliza Pratt (m. 1849)
- Children: 3, including Kathleen Honora and Elizabeth Eleanor
- Father: Thomas Greatorex

Henry Wellington Greatorex (1813 – September 1858) was an English-American musician, and composer, and music teacher.

== Biography ==
Greatorex was born in Burton upon Trent, Staffordshire. He received a thorough musical education from his father, Thomas Greatorex, who was for many years organist of Westminster Abbey, and conductor of the London "concerts of ancient music". The younger Greatorex came to the United States in 1839. In 1849, he married the painter Eliza Pratt; they had three children: Kathleen, Eleanor, and Thomas. Prior to settling in New York City as a teacher of music and organist at Calvary Church, he played at churches in Hartford, Connecticut, including Center Church and St. John's Episcopal Church in the adjacent city of West Hartford, Connecticut. Greatorex frequently sang in concerts and oratorios. For some years, he was organist and conductor of the choir at St. Paul's chapel.

Gloria Patri
Also known as the "Glory Be to the Father", the Gloria Patri is the minor, or lesser, doxology: a short hymn of praise to God in various Christian liturgies.

Greatorex did much to advance the standard of sacred music in the United States, in the days when country singing-school teachers imposed their trivial melodies and the convivial measures of foreign composers on the texts of the hymn books at hand. He published a Collection of Psalm and Hymn Tunes, Chants, Anthems, and Sentences (Boston, 1851). One of Greatorex's best-known compositions is a setting of the Gloria Patri, widely used in Protestant denominations for the singing of the doxology in services to this day.

He died in Charleston, South Carolina.
