= Thomas Greatorex =

English composer, astronomer and mathematician (1758–1831)

- Born: 5 October 1758; Wingfield, North East Derbyshire, Derbyshire, England
- Died: 18 July 1831 (aged 72)
- Occupations: Composer; astronomer; mathematician; organist; music teacher
- Employers: Carlisle Cathedral; Westminster Abbey
- Known for: Concerts of Antient Music
- Style: Classical; liturgical
- Children: 5, including Henry Wellington

Thomas Greatorex (5 October 1758 – 18 July 1831) was an English composer, astronomer and mathematician. As well as being organist of Westminster Abbey, he was a Fellow of the Royal Society.

== Early life and career ==
Born in Wingfield near Chesterfield, Derbyshire, Greatorex studied from a young age with Benjamin Cooke, organist of Westminster Abbey, and was a protégé of the Earl of Sandwich. For four years, he was organist of Carlisle Cathedral, and from there, went to live and work in Italy, where he became a friend of Charles Edward Stuart ("Bonnie Prince Charlie"). When the Stuart died in 1788, he left some of his music books to Greatorex, who returned to London the same year.

He was soon in much demand as a music teacher, and he succeeded Joah Bates as conductor of the Concerts of Antient Music. He also directed music festivals at Birmingham, York and Derby. In 1819, he succeeded George Ebenezer Williams as organist of Westminster Abbey.

His works as a composer include the anthem "This is the Day the Lord Hath Made".

== Family ==
His father, Anthony Greatorex, became organist at St Martin's Church, Leicester, (now Leicester Cathedral) in 1765. Thomas's sister Martha succeeded her father in that position from 1772 to 1800. From 1771, Anthony was organist at St Modwen's, Burton upon Trent, in which role Thomas succeeded him.

Thomas Greatorex married and had five sons. One of these, Henry Wellington Greatorex, became a church organist in Hartford, Connecticut, United States, and composed many hymns. Another son, Thomas junior, became organist of Holy Trinity, Burton upon Trent.

== Trivia ==
There is a story that King George IV, when Prince Regent, once said to Thomas Greatorex, "My father is Rex, but you are a Greater Rex".

== Sources ==
- Sadie, S. (ed.) (1980) The New Grove Dictionary of Music & Musicians, vol. 7.
- The Name of Greatorex
- Hymns Ancient and Modern. Richard Clay (The Chaucer press). 1986. ISBN 0-907547-37-0.
- The Noblemens and Gentlemen's Catch Club

Cultural offices
Preceded by George Ebenezer Williams	Organist and Master of the Choristers of Westminster Abbey; 1819–1831	Succeeded by James Turle
