= Sector (instrument) =

Mathematical instrument consisting of two hinged rulers

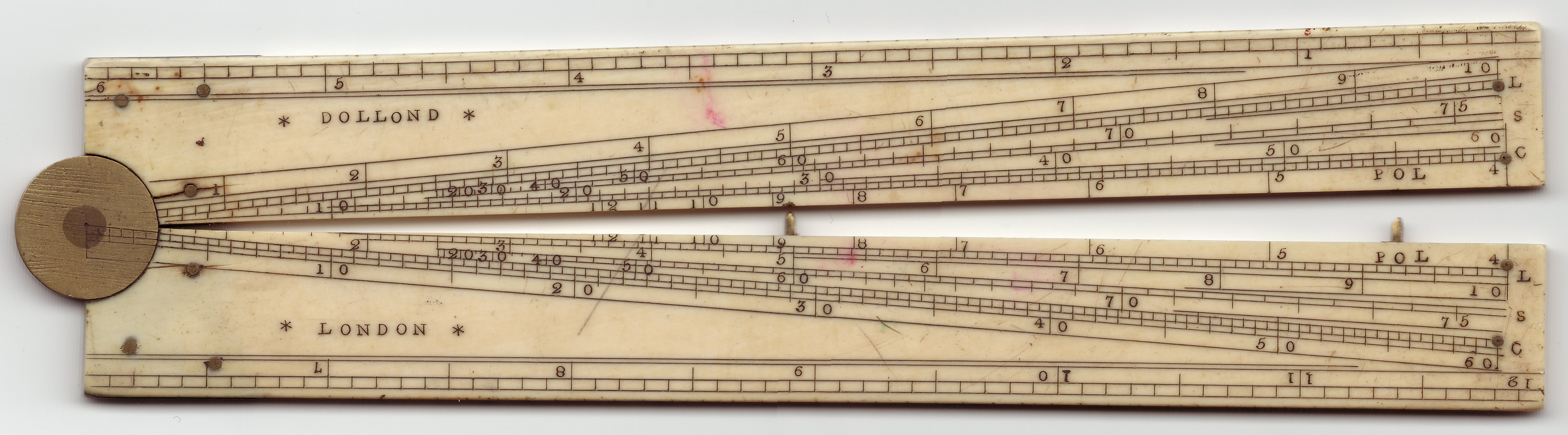
A typical English sector, probably from the early 19th century, made of ivory with a brass hinge. This side has scales for lines of lines (L), secants (S), chords (C), and polygons (POL), along with a scale of 10ths of inches on the outer edges forming a straight 12-inch rule when the sector is fully opened, and a scale of 100ths of a foot marked along the side (only barely visible in this picture).

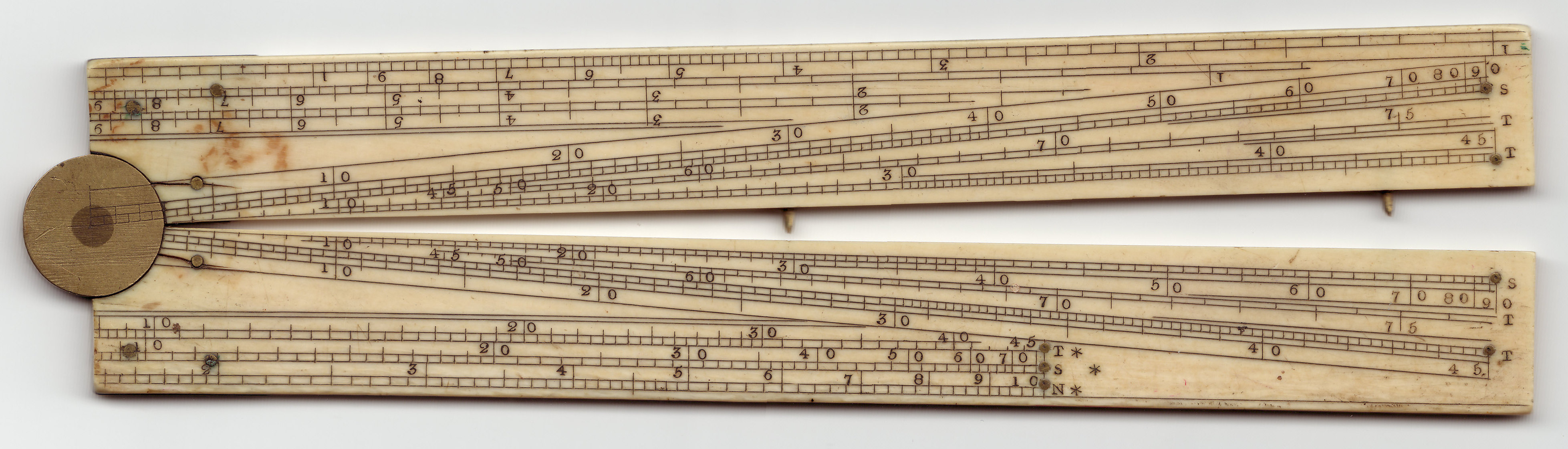
The other side of the same sector, with scales for a line of sines (S) and two lines of tangents (T), along with logarithmic Gunter's scales for numbers (N), sines (S), and tangents (T) on the outer edges.

The sector, also known as a sector rule, proportional compass, or military compass, is a major calculating instrument that was in use from the end of the sixteenth century until the nineteenth century. It is an instrument consisting of two rulers of equal length joined by a hinge. A number of scales are inscribed upon the instrument which facilitate various mathematical calculations. It is used for solving problems in proportion, multiplication and division, geometry, and trigonometry, and for computing various mathematical functions, such as square roots and cube roots. Its several scales permitted easy and direct solutions of problems in gunnery, surveying and navigation. The sector derives its name from the fourth proposition of the sixth book of Euclid, where it is demonstrated that similar triangles have their like sides proportional. Some sectors also incorporated a quadrant, and sometimes a clamp at the end of one leg which allowed the device to be used as a gunner's quadrant.

== History ==
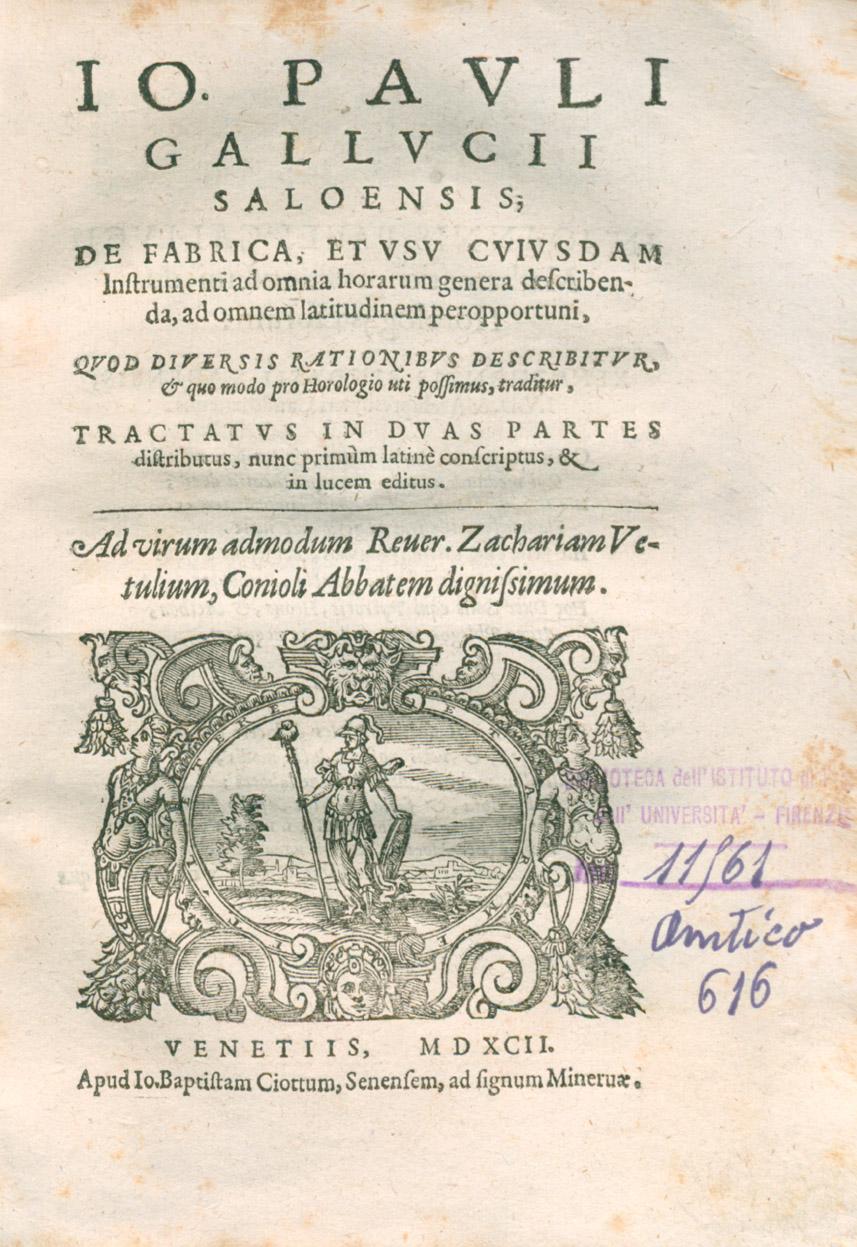
De fabrica et usu menti ad omnia horarum genera describenda (1592), where Giovanni Paolo Gallucci is among the first to describe the sector

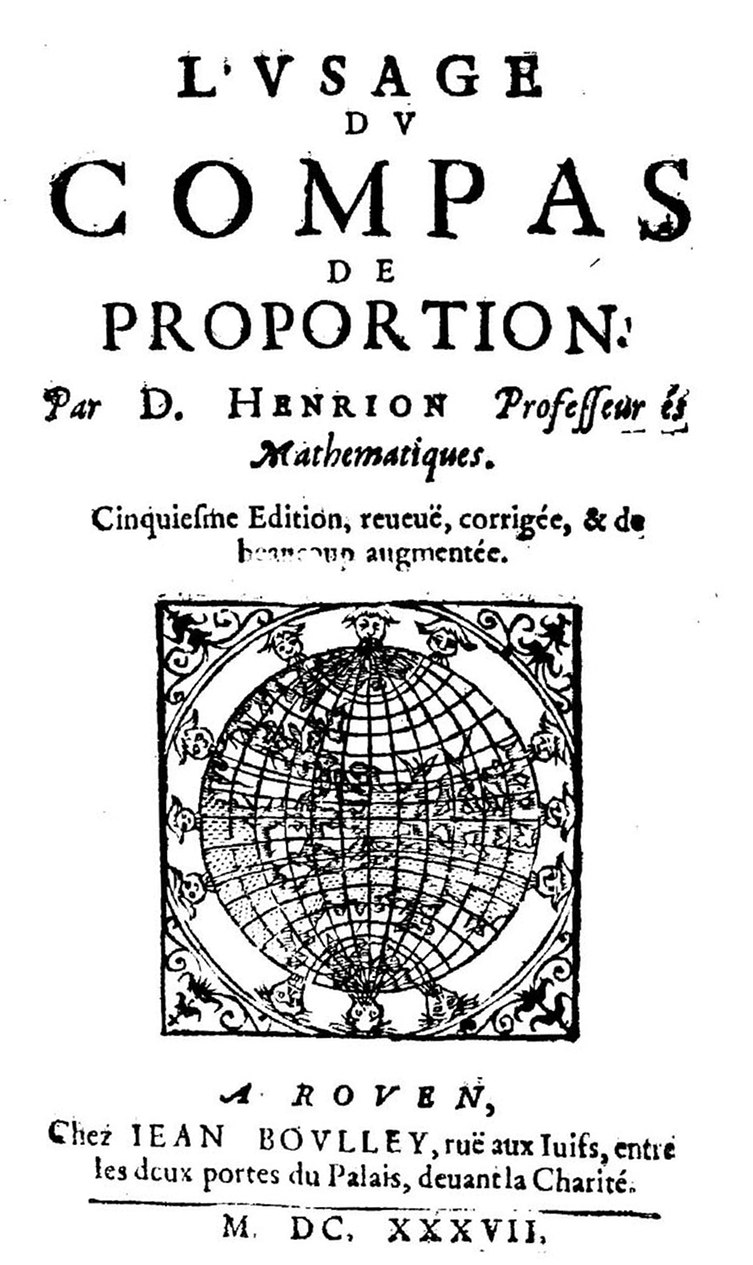
Clément Cyriaque de Mangin, Usage du compas de proportion, 1637

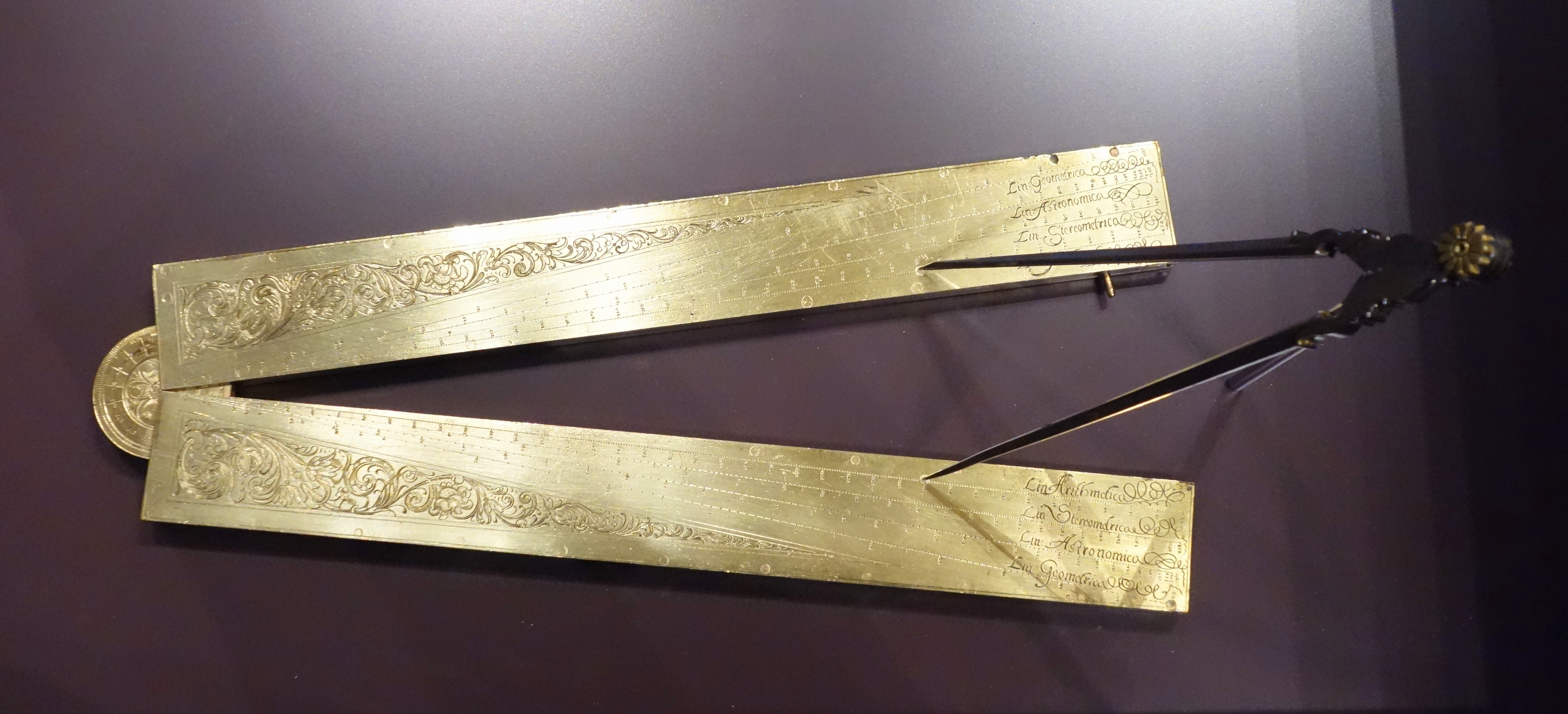
Brass sector with dividers, probably made in Dresden around 1630

The sector was invented, essentially simultaneously and independently, by a number of different people prior to the start of the 17th century.

Fabrizio Mordente (1532 – ca 1608) was an Italian mathematician who is best known for his invention of the "proportional eight-pointed compass" which has two arms with cursors that allow the solution of problems in measuring the circumference, area and angles of a circle. In 1567 he published a single sheet treatise in Venice showing illustrations of his device. In 1585 Giordano Bruno used Mordente's compass to refute Aristotle's hypothesis on the incommensurability of infinitesimals, thus confirming the existence of the "minimum" which laid the basis of his own atomic theory. Guidobaldo del Monte developed a "polymetric compass" c. 1670, including a scale for constructing regular polygons. The Italian astronomer Galileo Galilei added further scales in the 1590s, and published a book on the subject in 1606. Galileo's sector was first designed for military applications, but evolved into a general purpose calculating tool.

The two earliest known sectors in England were made by Robert Beckit and Charles Whitwell, respectively, both dated 1597. These have a strong resemblance to the description of the device given by English mathematician Thomas Hood's 1598 book. The sector Hood described was intended for use as a surveying instrument and included sights and a mounting socket for attaching the instrument to a pole or post, as well as an arc scale and an additional sliding leg. In the 1600s, the British mathematician Edmund Gunter dispensed with accessories but added additional scales, including a meridian line with divisions proportional to the spacing of latitudes along a meridian on the Mercator projection, privately distributing a Latin manuscript explaining its construction and use. Gunter published this in English as De Sectore et Radio in 1623.

== Galileo's sector ==
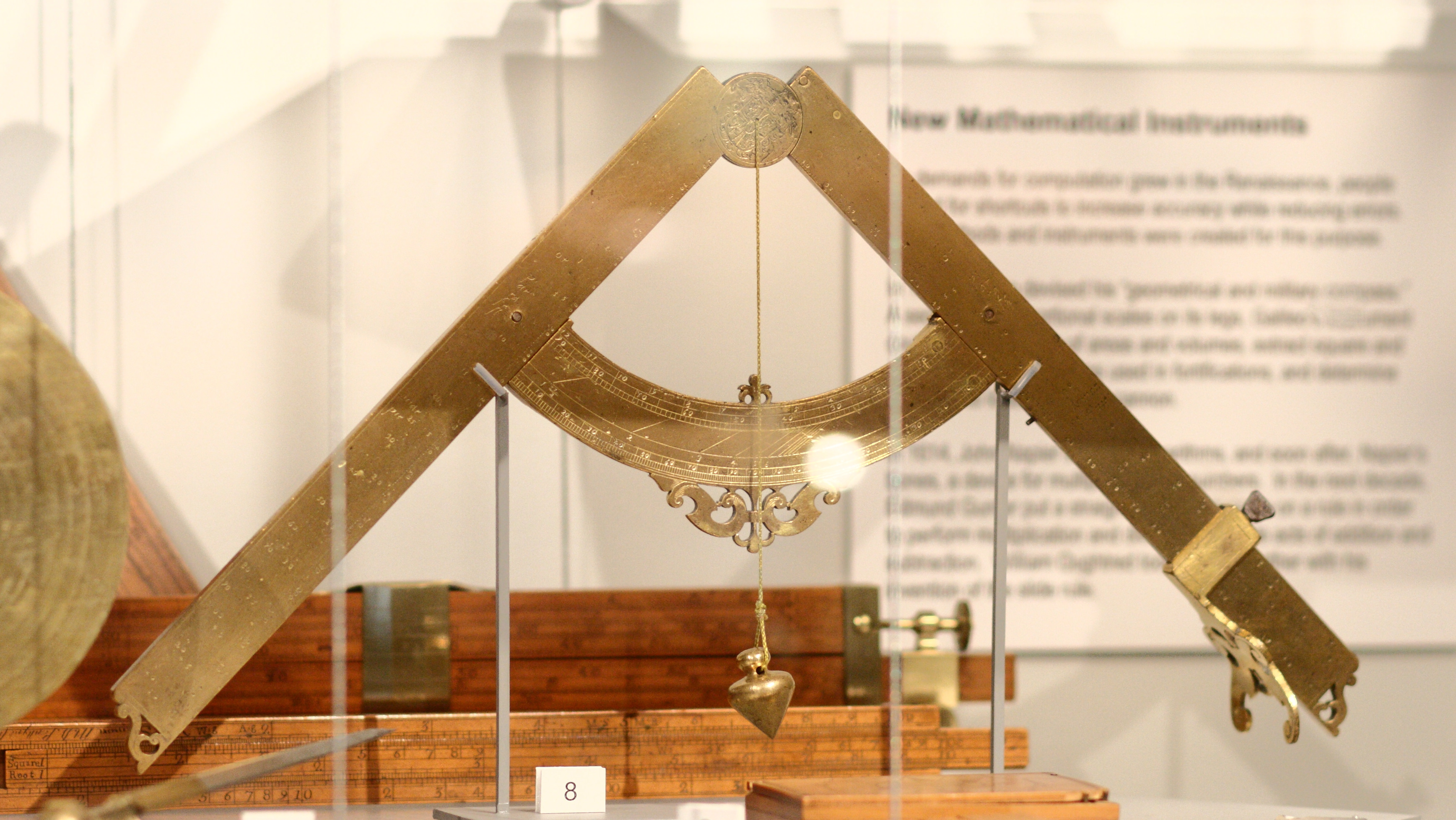
Galileo's geometrical and military compass, thought to have been made c. 1604 by Mazzoleni

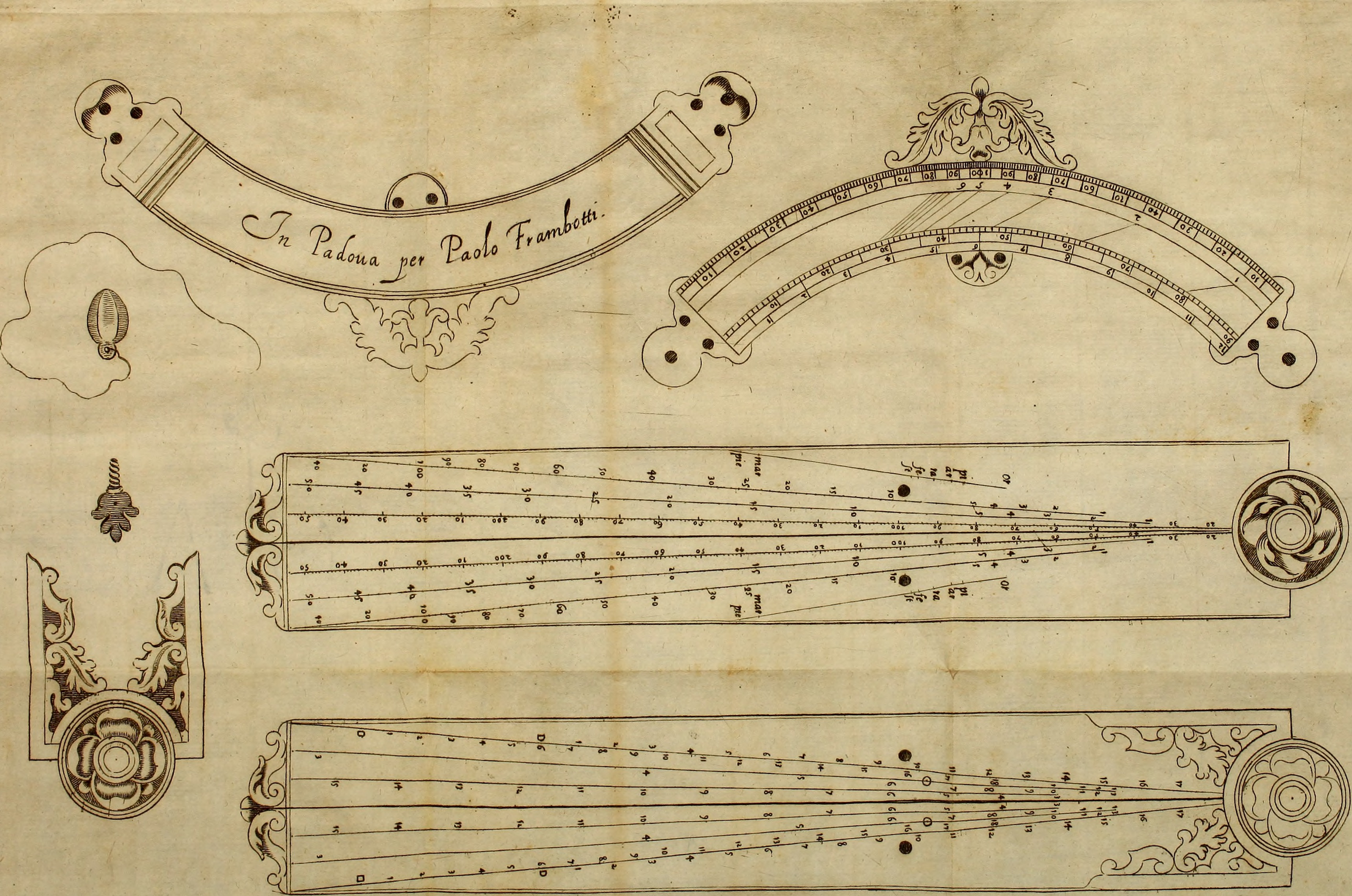
Figure showing the scales of Galileo's military compass, from his manual on the device.

Galileo first developed his sector in the early 1590s as a tool for artillerymen. By 1597 it had evolved into an instrument that had much broader utility. It could be used, for example, to calculate the area of any plane figure constructed from a combination of straight lines and semi-circles. Galileo was determined to improve his sector so that it could be used to calculate the area of any shape discussed in Euclid's Elements. To do this, he needed to add the capability to calculate the area of circular segments. It took him more than a year to solve this problem. The instrument we know today as Galileo's sector is the version with this added capability that he began to produce in 1599 with the help of the instrument maker Marc'Antonio Mazzoleni. Galileo provided Mazzoleni and his family with room and board, and paid him two-thirds of the 35 lire selling price; Galileo would charge 120 lire for a course teaching the use of the instrument, about half the annual wage of a skilled craftsmen. Most of his customers were wealthy noblemen, including Archduke Ferdinand, to whom Galileo sold a sector made of silver. More than a hundred were made in all, but only three are known to exist today: one in the Putnam Gallery at Harvard University, one in the Museum of Decorative Art in Milan's Castello Sforzesco, and one in the Galileo Museum in Florence.

Galileo described how to perform 32 different calculations with the sector in his 1606 manual. In the introduction, Galileo wrote that his intention in producing the sector was to enable people who had not studied mathematics to perform complex calculations without having to know the mathematical details involved. The sector was used in combination with a divider, also called a compass. Each arm of the sector was marked with four lines on the front, and three on the back, and the pivot had a dimple that would accept the point of a divider. The lines and scales on each arm were identical, and arranged in the same order as you moved from the inner edge to the outer edge, thus forming seven pairs of lines. All the calculations could be performed with some combination of five very simple steps: measuring some length, separation or object width with the divider; opening the arms of the sector and setting the crosswise distance between two corresponding points on a pair of lines to the divider separation; measuring the crosswise distance between two corresponding points on a pair of lines once the sector had been set to some separation; reading a value from one of the scales at a point where the crosswise distances matches a divider separation; and reading a value off a scale where the distance from the pivot matches a divider. Galileo did not describe how the scales were constructed, he considered that a trade secret, but the details can be inferred. Scale markings were placed with an accuracy of about 1%.

=== The arithmetic lines ===
The innermost scales of the instrument are called the arithmetic lines from their division in arithmetic progression, that is, a linear scale. The sector in the Galileo Museum is marked from 16 to 260. If we call the length from the pivot $A,$ then given two marks with values $n_1$ and $n_2,$ the ratios of their lengths are in proportion to the ratios of the numbers. In modern notation:

$$\frac{A_1}{A_2} = \frac{n_1}{n_2},$$

Galileo describes how to use these scales to divide a line into a number of equal parts, how to measure any fraction of a line, how to produce a scaled version of a figure or map, how to solve Euclid's Golden Rule (also called the Rule of Three), how to convert a value in one currency into the value in another currency, and how to calculate the compounded value of an investment.

As an example, the procedure for calculating the compounded value of an investment is as follows. If the initial investment is P0, set the divider to the distance from the pivot to the point marked at P0 on the arithmetic lines. Open the instrument and set the crosswise distance at the point 100–100 on the arithmetic lines to the distance just measured to P0. If the interest rate for the period is say 6%, then set the divider to the crosswise distance at 106-106. Place the divider at the pivot, and see where the other end falls on the arithmetic lines. This is the value of the investment at the end of the first period. Now set the crosswise distance at 100-100 again to the current divider separation and repeat the procedure for as many periods as needed.

=== The geometric lines ===
The next set of lines are called the geometric lines, which have a scale numbered from 1 to 50, with lengths proportional to the square root, called geometric because they are used for finding the geometric mean and working with areas of plane figures. If we call the length from the pivot $G,$ then:

$$\frac{G_1}{G_2} = \frac{\sqrt{n_1}}{\sqrt{n_2}}$$

Galileo describes how to use these lines to scale a figure such that the new figure has a given area ratio to the original, how to measure the area ratio of two similar figures, how to combine a set of similar figures into another similar figure such that the resulting figure has the combined area of the set, how to construct a similar figure that has area equal to the difference in area of two other similar figures, how to find the square root of a number, how to arrange N soldiers into a grid where the ratio of rows to columns is some specified value, and how to find the geometric mean of two numbers.

As an example, the procedure for producing a similar figure that has the combined area of a set of similar figures, is as follows: Choose a side in the largest figure and measure its length with a divider. Open the sector and set the crosswise distance at some intermediate value on the geometric lines to the divider separation, any number will do, say 20. Then measure the length of the corresponding side in each of the other figures, and read the Geometric Line scale value where the crosswise distance matches these lengths. Add together all the scale readings, including the 20 we originally set. At the combined value on the geometric lines, measure the crosswise distance. This will be the length of the side of the figure that has the combined area of the set. You can then use the arithmetic scale to scale all the other side lengths in the largest figure to match. This procedure will work for any closed figure made from straight lines.

The procedure for calculating a square root varies depending on the size of the radicand. For a "medium" number ("in the region of 5,000"), start by measuring the distance from the pivot to the point marked 40 on the arithmetic lines, and setting the crosswise distance of the sector at 16–16 on the geometric lines to this distance. Next take your number and divide by 100, rounding to the nearest integer. So for example 8679 becomes 87. If this number is greater than 50 (the largest value on the geometric lines scale) then it must be reduced, in this example perhaps divided by 3 to make 29. Next measure the crosswise distance on the geometric lines at 29, this distance on the arithmetic lines represents $\sqrt{2900}.$ Because our number was reduced to fit on the sector, we must scale the length up by $\sqrt{3}.$ We can choose any convenient value, e.g. 10, setting the sector crosswise distance at 10 to the divider separation, and then measure the crosswise distance at 30 on the geometric lines, then place the divider against the arithmetic lines to measure $\sqrt{8700},$ which is close enough to $\sqrt{8679}$

The procedure for calculating the square root of a “small” number, a number “around 100”, is simpler: we don't bother dividing by 100 at the beginning but otherwise perform the same procedure. At the end, divide the resulting square root estimate by 10. For "large" numbers ("around 50,000"), set the sector crosswise at 10–10 on the geometric lines to the distance from the pivot to the point at 100 on the arithmetic lines. Divide the number by 1000 and round to the nearest integer. Then follow a similar procedure as before.

Galileo provides no further guidance, or refinement. Knowing which procedure to use for a given number requires some thought, and an appreciation for the propagation of uncertainty.

=== The stereometric lines ===
The stereometric lines are so called because they relate to stereometry, the geometry of three-dimensional objects. The scale is marked to 148, and the distance from the pivot is proportional to the cube root. If we call the length $S,$ then

$$\frac{S_1}{S_2} = \frac{\sqrt[3]{n_1}}{\sqrt[3]{n_2}}$$

These lines operate in an analogous way to the geometric lines, except that they deal with volumes instead of areas.

Galileo describes how to use these lines to find the corresponding side length in a similar solid where the solid has a given volume ratio to the original, how to determine the volume ratio of two similar solids given the lengths of a pair of corresponding sides, how to find the side lengths of a similar solid that has the combined volume of a set of other similar solids, how to find the cube root of a number, how to find the two values intermediate between two numbers $p$ and $q$ such that $n_1 = r p$, $n_2 = r^2 p$ and $q = r^3 p$ for a given scaling factor $r$, and how to find the side of a cube that has the same volume as a rectangular cuboid (square-cornered box).

To cube a rectangular cuboid of sides $a$, $b,$ and $c$ amounts to computing $s = \sqrt[3]{abc}.$ Galileo's method is to first use the geometric lines to find the geometric mean of two of the sides, $g = \sqrt{ab}.$ He then measures the distance along the arithmetic lines to the point marked $g$ using a divider, and then sets the sector crosswise to this distance at the point marked $g$ on the stereometric lines, calibrating the sector so that the distance from the pivot to the point $g$ on the stereometric lines represents $\sqrt[3]{ab},$ the side of a cube with the volume of a cuboid with sides $a,$ $b,$ and $1.$ He then measures the distance from the pivot to the point marked $c$ on the arithmetic lines, and sees at what value on the stereometric lines this distance fits crosswise, thus multiplying the previous result by $\sqrt[3]{c},$ resulting in $\sqrt[3]{abc}$ as desired.

The procedure for calculating cube roots is like that used for square roots, except that it only works for values of 1,000 or more. For “medium” numbers we set the sector crosswise at 64–64 on the stereometric lines to the distance from the pivot to the point marked 40 on the arithmetic lines. We then drop the last three digits from our number, and if the number we dropped was more than 500, we add one to the remainder. We measure the crosswise distance on the stereometric lines at the remainder value, and place this against the arithmetic lines to find the cube root. The largest number that can be handled without rescaling here is 148,000. For “large” numbers we set the sector crosswise at 100–100 on the stereometric lines to the distance from the pivot to the point 100 on the arithmetic lines, and instead of dropping three digits, we drop four. This can handle numbers from 10,000 up to 1,480,000 without rescaling. For practical use, you should use the medium number procedure for all values up to 148,000 that are not within about 2% of a multiple of 10,000.

=== The metallic lines ===
The metallic lines, the outermost pair on the front face, are marked with the symbols "ORO" (for oro, gold), PIO (for piombo, lead), "AR" (for argento, silver), "RA" (for rame, copper), "FE" (for ferro, iron), "ST" (for stagno, tin), "MA" (for marmo, marble), and "PIE" (for pietra, stone). These symbols are arranged by decreasing specific weights or densities, with distance proportional to the inverse cube root. Given two materials of density $\rho_1$ and $\rho_2,$ if we call the length from the pivot $M,$

$$\frac{M_1}{M_2} = \frac{\sqrt[3]{\rho_2}}{\sqrt[3]{\rho_1}}$$

The ratio of lengths on this scale is proportional to the ratio of diameters of two balls of the same weight but different materials.

These lines were of interest to artillerymen to solve the problem of “making the caliber”, that is how to figure out the correct powder charge to use for a cannonball of some size and material, when the correct charge is known for a cannonball of a different size and material. To do that, you would measure the diameter of the cannonball with the known charge and set the sector crosswise at this cannonball's material mark on the metallic lines to that diameter. The crosswise distance at the second cannonball's material type gives you the diameter of a cannonball in this material that is the same weight as the first ball. We need to scale this length down stereometrically to the given diameter of the second ball to get the correct charge, so we set the crosswise distance on the stereometric lines at 100–100 to the crosswise distance we just measured from the metallic lines, and then see where the crosswise distance on the stereometric lines matches the actual diameter of the second ball. The charge required is then in the ratio of this scale reading to 100 compared to the ball with known charge. You could then use the arithmetic lines to scale the charge weight in this ratio.

=== The polygraphic lines ===
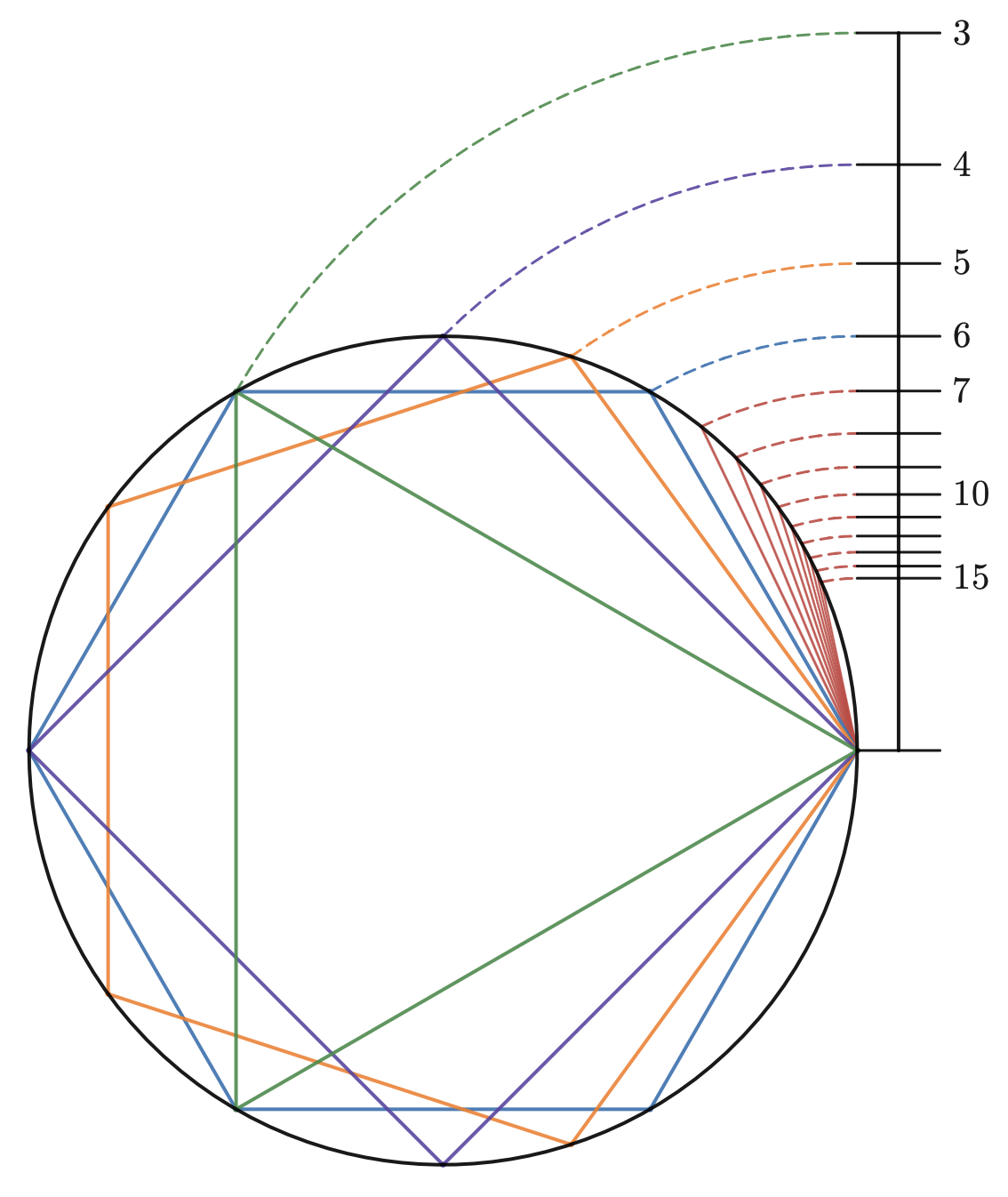
The scale of polygons on a typical sector has lines proportional to the side length of a regular polygon of n sides inscribed in a given circle. In Galileo's sector design, he inverted this scale so that the numbers increase as they go away from the hinge and are more uniformly spaced. Later designs both in England and Continental Europe reverted to the original polygon scale.

The polygraphic lines, innermost scale on the back of the instrument, is labelled from 3 to 15, and the distance from the pivot is inversely proportional to the side length of a regular polygon of $n$ sides inscribed in a given circle, or directly proportional to the circumradius of a regular polygon of $n$ sides of a given length. If $P$ is the length on the polygraphic scale and $\operatorname{crd}$ represents the trigonometric chord length of a circular arc measured in degrees, then

$$\frac{P_1}{P_2} = \frac{\operatorname{crd}{\dfrac{360^\circ}{n_2}}}{\operatorname{crd}{\dfrac{360^\circ}{n_1}}}.$$

Using functional notation in terms of the modern sine function,

$$P(n) = \frac{R}{2 \sin{\dfrac{\pi}{n}}}$$

where $R$ is the circumradius for a hexagon, $P(6) = R.$ These lines can be used to aid in the construction of any regular polygon from the 3-sided equilateral triangle to the 15-sided pentadecagon.

Galileo describes how to use these lines to find the radius of an enclosing circle for a polygon of n sides of a given length or in the other direction how to find the length of a chord that divides the circumference of a circle into $n$ parts. The procedure for finding the radius of the enclosing circle is as follows: Open the sector and set the crosswise distance at the point 6–6 on the polygraphic lines to the desired side length. The distance measured crosswise at $n$ on the polygraphic lines is the radius of the enclosing circle.

=== The tetragonic lines ===
The tetragonic lines are marked from 13 down to 3 as you move away from the pivot, and the distance from the pivot can be inferred to be $L(n) = L_t \sqrt{\frac{n}{\sqrt{3}\tan\frac{180}{n}}}$, where $L_t$ is the distance from the pivot to the point marked 3. There is a circle on the scale that lies nearly midway between 6 and 7. The name comes from tetragon (quadrilateral), as the main purpose of these lines is the quadrature of regular polygons, that is, finding the side of a square whose area is the same as the given regular polygon. They can also be used to square the circle.

The area of a regular polygon with $n$ sides is $A(n) = L^2 \frac{n}{4\tan\frac{180}{n}}$, where $L$ is the side length of the polygon. The radius of the circle with equal area is $r = L \frac{n}{4\pi\tan\frac{180}{n}}$. The value of $n$ at which the radius of the circle is the same as the side length of the polygon, is $n=6.5437$. There is, of course, no such polygon, but this gives us a reference point on the Tetragonic Lines, the indicated circle, where it is easy to read off crosswise the radius of the circle that is equal in area to the polygon with $n$ sides if we set the sector at $n$ on the Tetragonic Lines crosswise to the polygon side length. Squaring the circle is then just using $n=4$. To square the polygon, all we do is set the sector crosswise at $n$ to the side length, and measure crosswise at $n=4$. It is just as easy to find the required side lengths for any two polygons of equal area with different number of sides.

=== The added lines ===
The outermost set of lines on the back have a double scale, an outer and an inner scale. The outer scale is linear and runs from 18 down to 0 as you move away from the pivot, and the zero point is marked with a ⌓, the symbol for a circular segment. This zero point is about 70% of the way out along the arm. The inner scale is also described to run from 18 down to 0, but the sector in the Galileo Museum is only marked from 17. The zero point on the inner scale lies further out on the arm, at a distance of $\sqrt{\pi/2} L_a$ where $L_a$ is the distance from the pivot to the zero on the outer scale, and the zero is marked with a small square. The outer scale zero lies close to the point marked 6 on the inner scale. The inner scale at first glance also appears linear, but its point spacings are actually determined by a fairly complex formula which we have to infer as Galileo does not describe how this scale was constructed. The name of these lines derives from the fact that they were added by Galileo to an earlier version of his sector. These lines are used for squaring circular segments, that is finding the side length of a square that is equal in area to a circular segment with a given chord length and height, where the segment is at most a semicircle.

The procedure for square a circular segment is as follows. Measure the half-length of the chord, $c$. At the chord midpoint, measure the length of the line perpendicular to the chord to where it intersects the circle, the height $h$. Set the sector crosswise on the added lines at the zero of the outer scale to the half-chord length, $c$. Find the point on the outer scale, $n$, where the crosswise distance is $h$; $h$ must be less than or equal to $c$. Move to the point on the inner scale that is also marked $n$. The crosswise distance between the points n-n on the inner scale is the side length of the square equal in area to the circular segment.

To see how this works, we start by noting (as can be seen in the figure in circular segment), that the area of the segment is the difference between the area of the pie slice defined by where the chord cuts the circle, and the triangle formed by the chord and the two radii that touch the ends of the chord. The base of the triangle has length $2c$, and the height of the triangle is $r-h$, so the area of the triangle is $A_t = c(r-h)$. Using Pythogras' theorem, we can show that $r=(c^2+h^2)/2h$. The area of the pie slice is the fraction of the area of the circle covered by the angle $\theta$. For $\theta$ in radians, this area is $A_{pie} = \theta/2 r^2 = r^2\arcsin(c/r)$, where $\arcsin$ is the inverse sine function. If we define $x = h/c$, and $z = (1+x^2)/2x$, then we can write the area of the segment as $A_{seg} = c^2 (z^2\arcsin 1/z -z +x)$.

The distance from the pivot to the point marked $n$ on the outer scale is $L_{outer}(n) = L_a(1-n/20)$ where $L_a$ is the distance from the pivot to the zero point on the outer scale. When we set the sector crosswise to $c$ at the zero point and find the point on the outer scale where the crosswise distance is $h$, we set up a pair of similar triangles that share the angle made by the arms of the sector at the pivot, so that $h/c = 1 - n/20$. If we set the distance of the point $n$ from the pivot on the inner scale to $L_{inner}(n) = L_a\sqrt{z^2\arcsin 1/z -z +x}$, with $x = 1-n/20$, and $z$ defined as before, then the crosswise distance measured at $n$ on the inner scale will be the side length of the square with area equal to that of the segment.

== Other uses ==
The sector came with a plumb bob and a detachable quadrant which, when in place, would lock the arms at 90° to each other. The sector could then be used for sighting and distance measurements using triangulation, with applications in surveying and ballistics. The sector could also be used to easily determine the elevation of a cannon by inserting one arm into the barrel and reading the elevation from the location of the plumb bob.
