= Thomas Hood (mathematician) =

English mathematician and physician (1556–1620)

Thomas Hood (1556 – 1620) was an English mathematician and physician, the first lecturer in mathematics appointed in England, a few years before the founding of Gresham College. He publicized the Copernican theory, and discussed the nova SN 1572. (Tycho's Nova). He also innovated in the design of mathematical and astronomical instruments.

== Life ==
He entered Trinity College, Cambridge in 1573, and graduated B.A. in 1578; he was elected to a fellowship in the same year, and graduated M.A. in 1581. His Cambridge licence to practice as a physician was from 1585. He was approached to lecture in mathematics in 1582, by the merchant Thomas Smythe. The lectures in fact began in 1588.

He lectured from 1588 to 1592. The applications in view were military (intended for Captains of train bands, in other words for militia commanders at the time of the Spanish Armada), and subsequently aimed at naval needs and navigation. The first lectures were in the Staples Inn Chapel, but the regular venue became Smythe's London house, Leadenhall in Gracechurch Street. Other supporters of the lectures were Sir John Wolstenholme and John Lumley, 1st Baron Lumley; Hood was a subscriber in 1589 to the Virginia Company, with which his merchant backers were associated. Hood's original publications were probably derived from notes of the talks. He collaborated with the engraver Augustine Ryther on both celestial and terrestrial charts.

In later life he lived in Abchurch Lane, London, practiced as a physician, and sold copies of his hemisphere charts.

== Works ==
- A Copie of the Speache ... (1588)
- The Use of the Celestial Globe in Plano, set forth in two hemispheres (1590)
- The Use of Jacobs Staffe
- Making and Use of the Sector
- Elementes of Geometrie (1590), translated from the Latin of Petrus Ramus, Geometriae Septem Et Viginti
- A translation of the arithmetic of Christian Wursteisen (1596)
- Work on surveying (1598).

== See also ==
- Backstaff
- Sector (instrument)
