= Ralph Greatorex =

English mathematician (c. 1625–1675)

Ralph Greatorex (c. 1625–1675) was an English mathematician, mathematical instrument maker, and an apprentice of London clockmaker Elias Allen.

Greatorex is mentioned in John Aubrey's Brief Lives as a great friend of William Oughtred the mathematician. He is also briefly referred to in Aubrey's 'Natural History of Wilts', and in the 'Macclesfield Correspondence'. John Evelyn met Greatorex on 8 May 1656, and saw his 'excellent invention to quench fire.' His name appears in 'Pepys's Diary.' On 10 October 1660, when several engines were shown at work in St. James's Park, 'above all the rest,' says Samuel Pepys, 'I liked that which Mr. Greatorex brought, which do carry up the water with a great deal of ease.'

On 24 October Pepys bought of Greatorex a drawing-pen, 'and he did show me the manner of the lamp-glasses which carry the light a great way, good to read in bed by, and I intend to have one of them. And we looked at his wooden jack in his chimney, that goes with the smoake, which indeed is very pretty.' On 9 June and 20 September 1662 and 23 March 1663 ('this day Greatorex brought me a very pretty weather-glasse for heat and cold') Pepys met the inventor; the last entry, 23 May 1663, refers to his varnish, 'which appears every whit as good upon a stick which he hath done, as the Indian.'

As well as Pepys, Allen, Oughtred and Evelyn, others that Greatorex worked or corresponded with included Samuel Hartlib, Christopher Wren, Robert Boyle, Edward Phillips and Jonas Moore. He also attended meetings of the Royal Society, and did horticultural experiments at Arundel House.

== Notes ==
- Stephen, Leslie; Lee, Sidney, eds. (1890). "Greatorex, Ralph" . Dictionary of National Biography. Vol. 23. London: Smith, Elder & Co.
