= Ken Greatrex =

English footballer

Personal information
- Full name: George Kenneth William Greatrex
- Position: Goalkeeper

Senior career*
Years	Team	Apps	(Gls)
- Orrell
- Marine
- Burscough Rangers
1928–1930	Wrexham	17	(0)
- New Brighton
- Crewe Alexandra
- Workington
- Runcorn
- Stoneycroft St. Paul's
- Manchester North End
- * Club domestic league appearances and goals

George Kenneth William Greatrex (date of birth unknown) was a professional footballer who played as a goalkeeper. He made appearances in the English Football League for Wrexham.
