= Eliza Pratt Greatorex =

Irish-American painter (1819–1897)

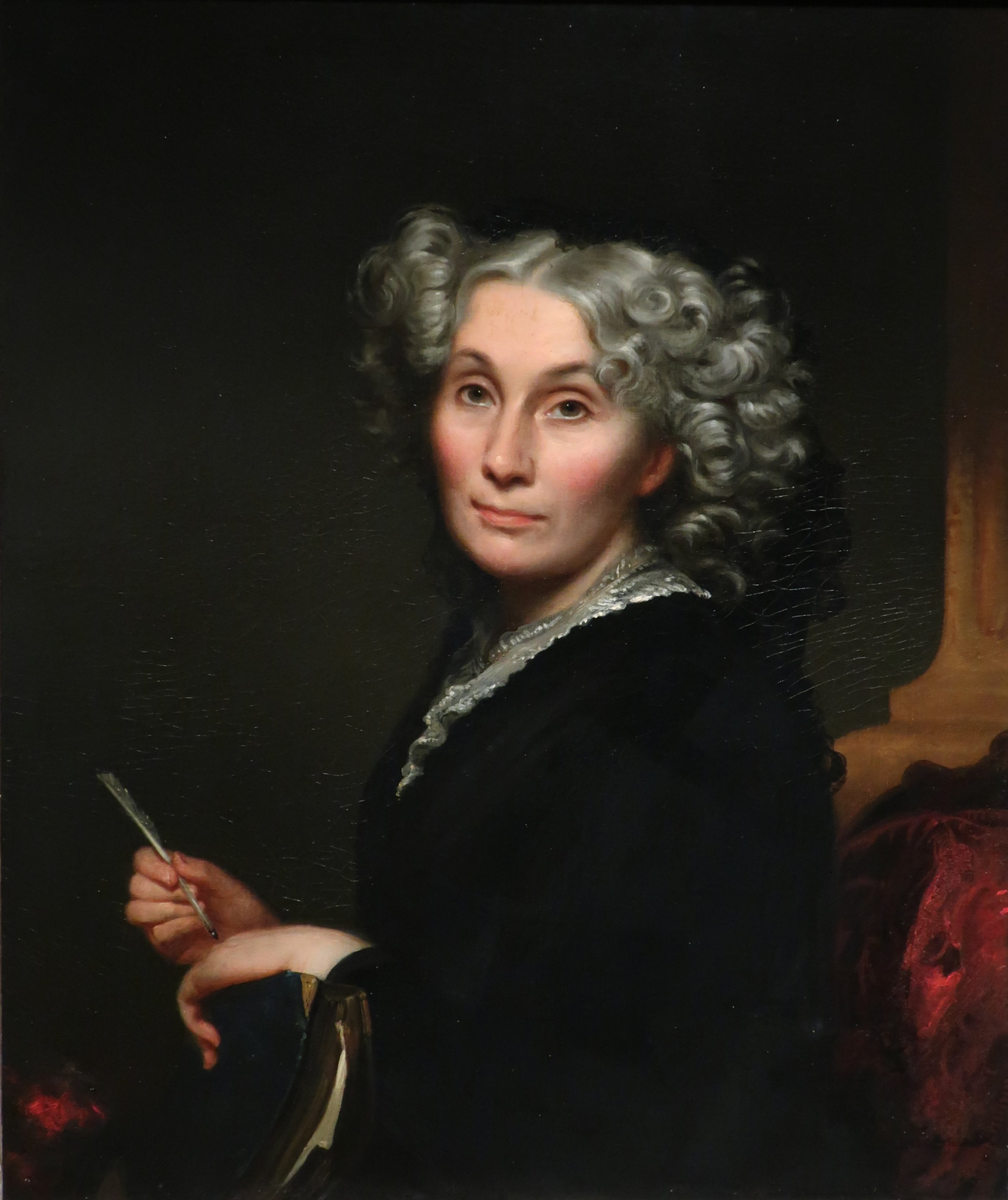
- Portrait of Eliza Pratt Greatorex (1869) by Ferdinand Thomas Lee Boyle. Credit National Academy of Design, New York
- Born: Eliza Pratt; December 25, 1819; Manorhamilton, Ireland
- Died: February 9, 1897 (aged 77); Paris, France
- Known for: Painting
- Movement: Hudson River School
- Spouse: Henry Wellington Greatorex (m. 1849; died 1858)
- Children: Kathleen Honora Greatorex; Eleanor Greatorex

Eliza Pratt Greatorex (December 25, 1819 – February 9, 1897) was an Irish-born American artist who was affiliated with the Hudson River School. She is known for her landscape paintings as well as for several series of pen-and-ink drawings and etchings that were published in book form. She was the second woman to be elected an associate of the National Academy of Design, following Ann Hall.

== Family and education ==
Eliza Pratt was born in Manorhamilton, Ireland, the daughter of James Calcott Pratt, a Methodist minister. The family moved to New York in 1840, where in 1849 she married Henry Wellington Greatorex, a musician. They had three children: two daughters, Elizabeth Eleanor and Kathleen Honora — both of whom would grow up to become artists — and a son, Thomas, who settled in Colorado. Mortally wounded during an altercation in Silverton, Thomas Greatorex died at Durango in 1880.

Between 1854 and 1856, Greatorex studied art with the painters William Wallace Wotherspoon and James Hart and his brother William in New York, and by 1855 she had begun exhibiting sketches. However, it was only when Greatorex was widowed in 1858 that she was able to pursue art full-time. She subsequently supported herself and her children through help from her siblings, sales of her art, and by teaching for 15 years at a girls' school.

In 1861–62, she studied with the painter Émile Lambinet outside Paris. In 1870, she traveled to Germany with her daughters and they studied at the Pinakothek in Munich. In 1872, Greatorex published The Homes of Oberammergau, an account of her three-month visit to the village and its passion-play, illustrated by twenty heliotype prints of pen and ink drawings. Dissatisfied with commercial reproductions of her work, she went to Paris to study engraving with Charles Henri Toussaint. Greatorex and her daughters purchased Les Remparts, a residential compound in the town of Moret sur Loing et Orvanne. American sculptor George Grey Barnard rented a studio on the property. Greatorex and her daughters befriended Impressionist painter Alfred Sisley, whom they helped to support by furnishing their home with his works. Impoverished at the time of his death in 1899, Sisley was buried in the Greatorex family plot in the Cimetiere de Moret-sur-Loing.

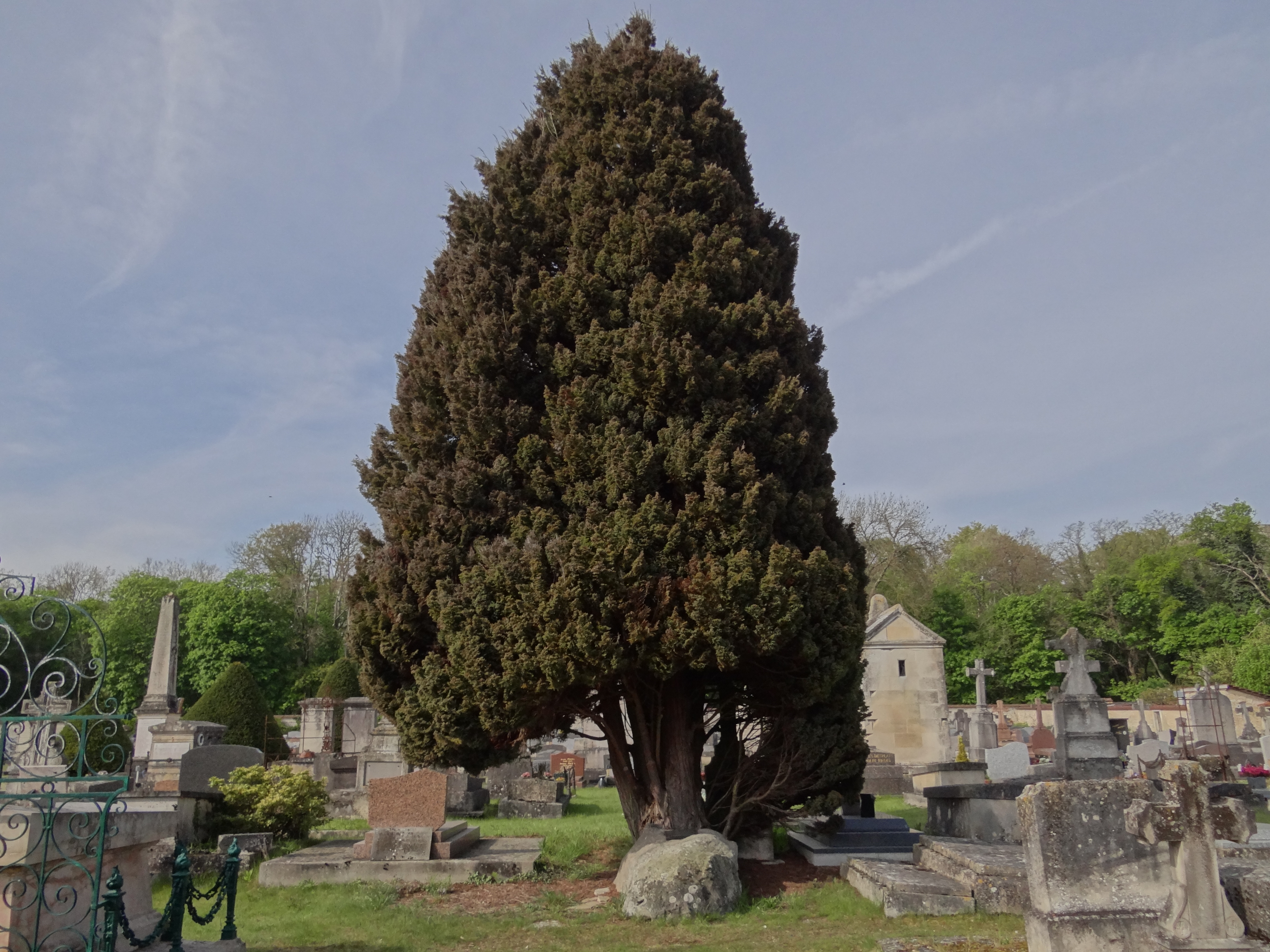
Grave of Alfred Sisley. On the right is the grave of Eliza Pratt Greatorex.

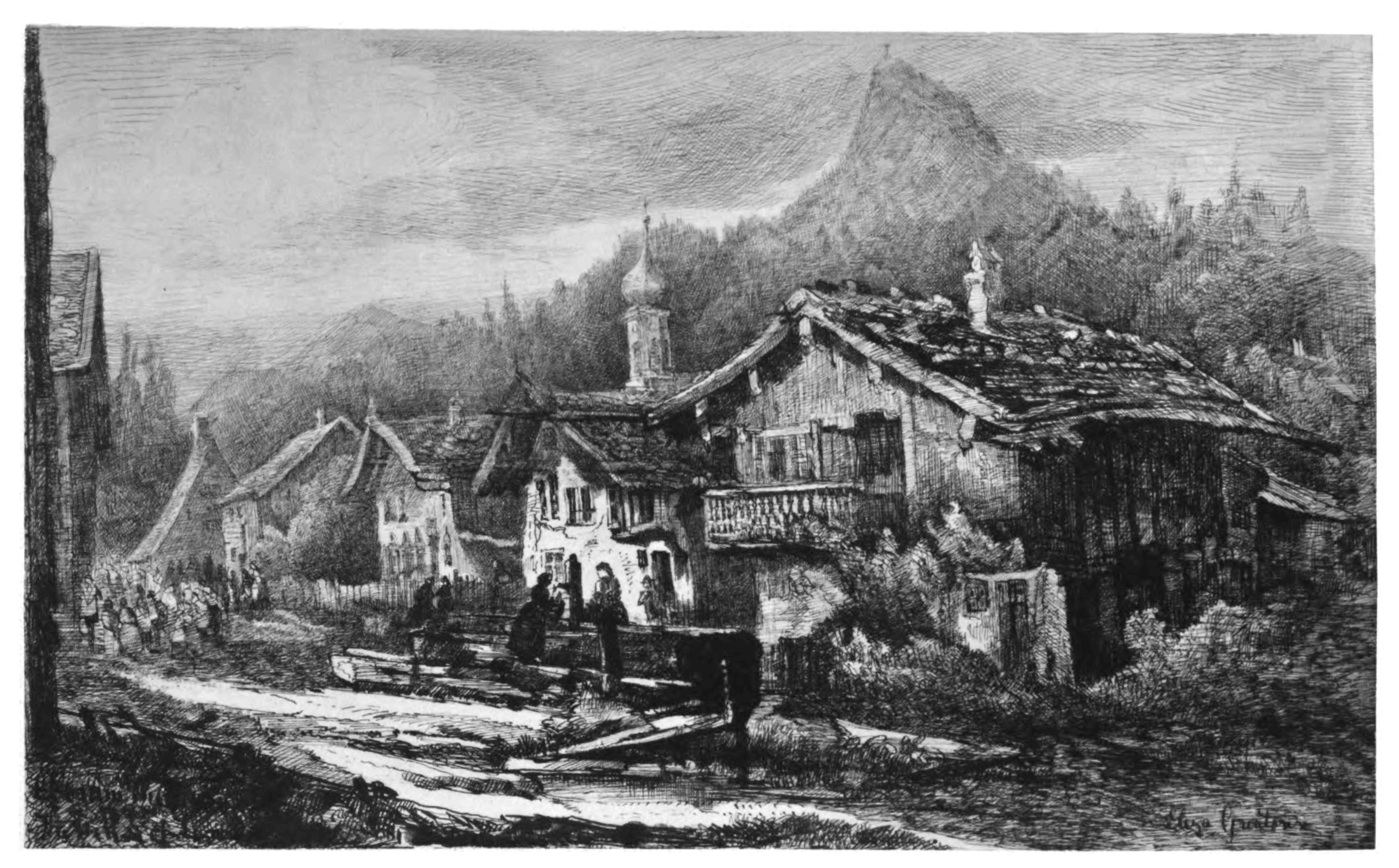
Homes of Oberammergau

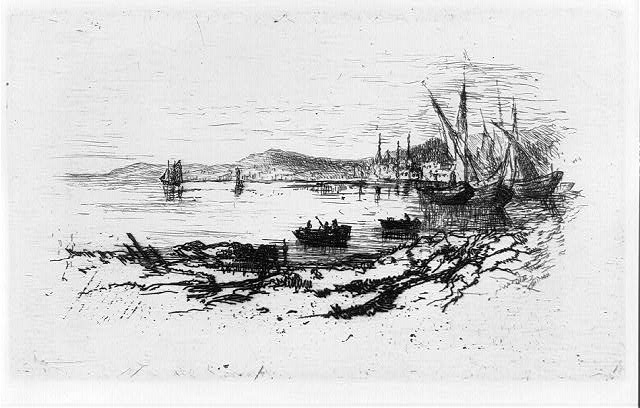
Bay of Naples, Italy, etching by Eliza Pratt Greatorex

== Art career ==
Greatorex first became known as a landscape painter of the Hudson River School. She often worked en plein air, and her landscapes reflect her careful observation of her environment. Her best-known paintings are View on the Houstonic (1863), The Forge (1864), and Somerindyke House (1869). One series of paintings was executed on panels taken from specific churches; these include Bloomingdale Church and The North Dutch Church (painted on panels taken from the North Dutch Church on Fulton Street in New York City) and St. Paul's Church, painted on a panel taken from that church.

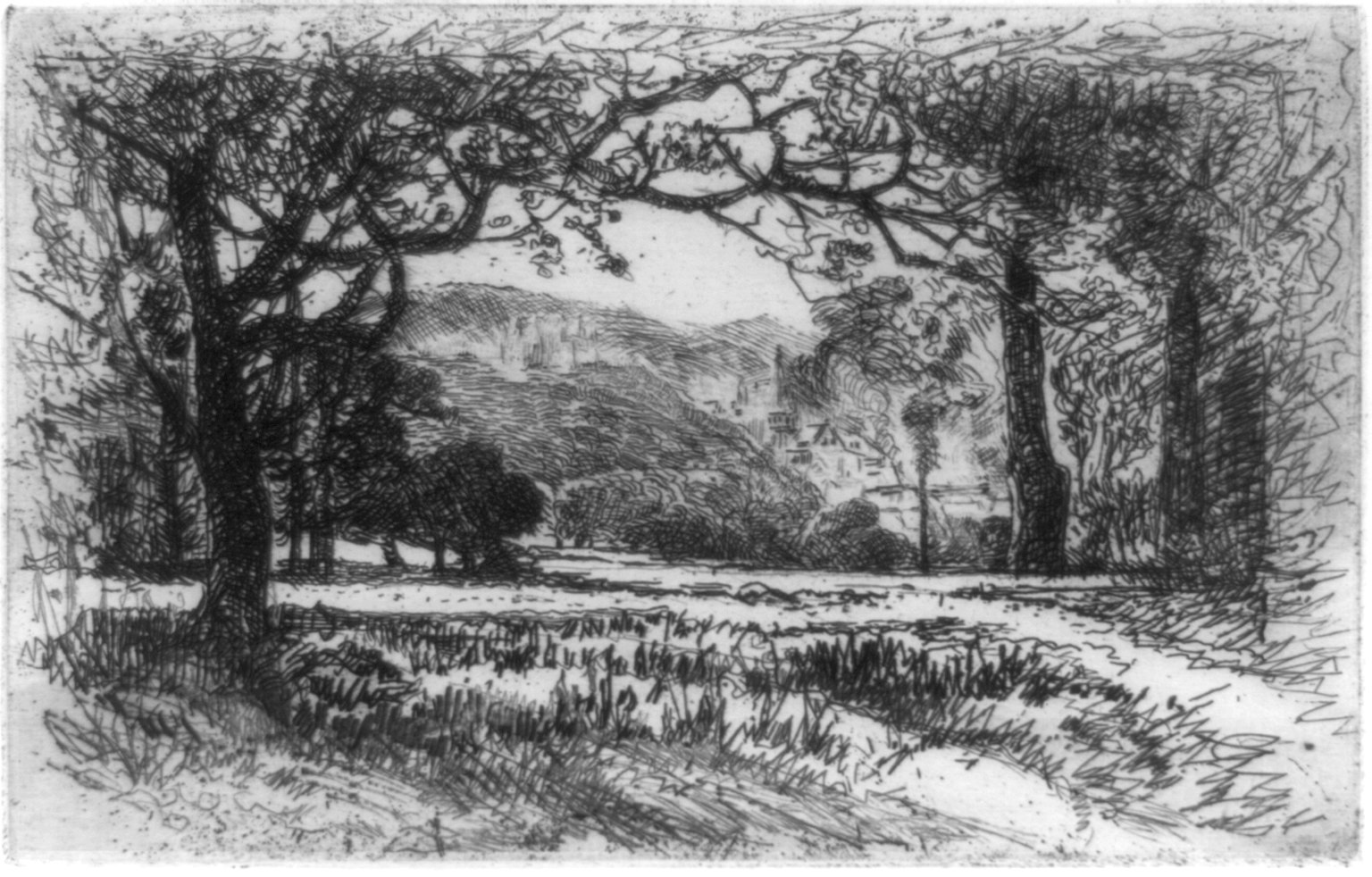
A house on the Hudson, Washington Heights

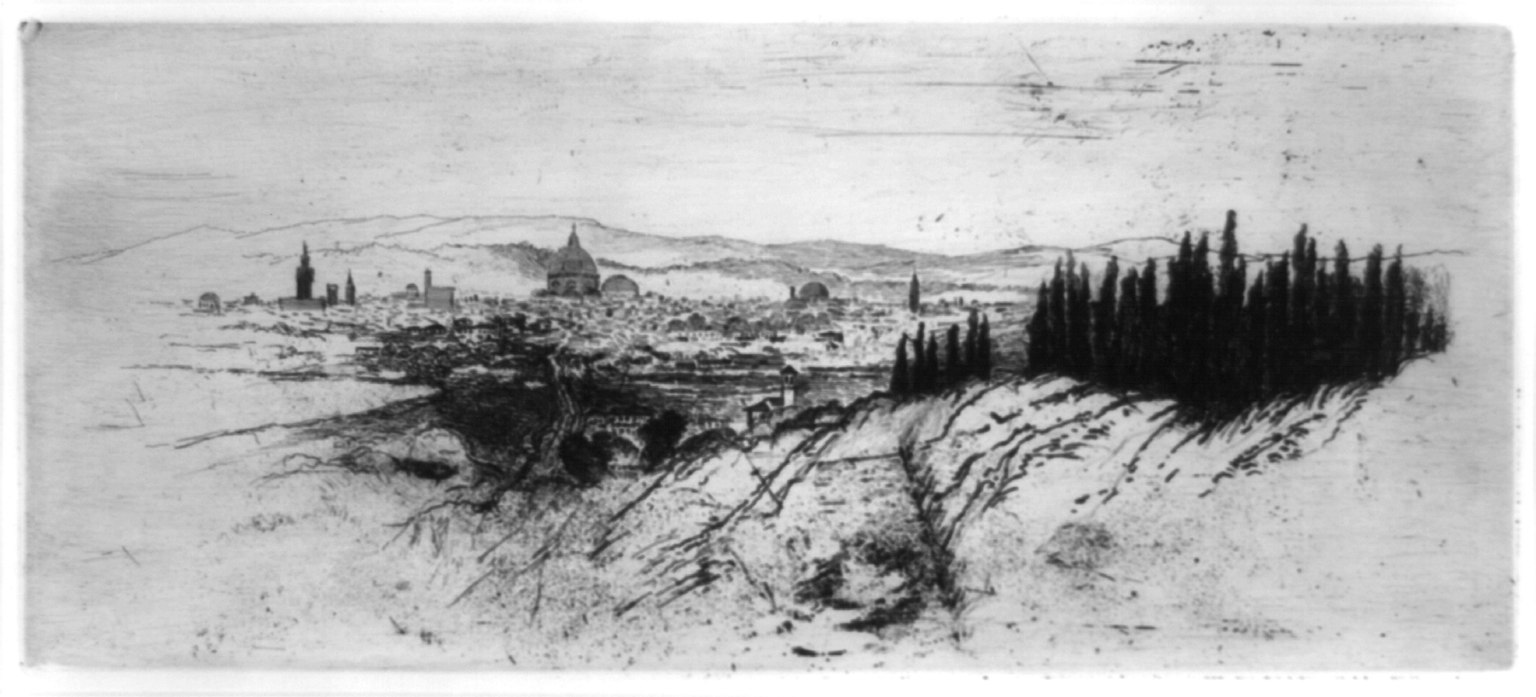
View of Florence, 1886, from Maiano, (Italy)

After a few years, Greatorex's artistic practice migrated from painting to pen-and-ink sketches, which she elaborated as etchings. Experimenting with new printing methods, Greatorex published many of her images in book form. Many of her sketches consist of architectural subjects, often framed by foliage, and drawings of landscapes produced during several trips to Europe in the 1860s and 1870s. In 1870–1872, she visited Nuremberg and Ober-Ammergau, Germany; Munich, Austria; and various parts of Italy. The Nuremberg and Ober-Ammergau trips led to the publication of Etchings in Nuremberg (1873) and The Homes of Ober-Ammergau (1873). Her large pen-and-ink drawing of Albrecht Dürer's house in Nuremberg is now in the Vatican in Rome.

In the summer of 1873, she traveled to the Rocky Mountains with her daughters and published a series of etchings from her sojourn in Colorado. The preface was written by Sara Jane Lippincott.

With an eye to America's upcoming centennial, in 1875 Greatorex published Old New York from the Battery to Bloomingdale, a book of drawings of historic buildings demolished during the post-Civil War real estate development of Manhattan, with a commentary by her sister Matilda Despard, and an introduction by William Cullen Bryant. Sketches from this series, along with selected paintings were exhibited in the 1876 Centennial Exposition in Philadelphia.

In 1868, Greatorex was elected an associate of the National Academy of Design, becoming the second woman to receive that recognition after Ann Hall, who had died some six years earlier. She was also a member of the Artists' Fund Society of New York. Greatorex belonged to a circle of feminists that included Susan B. Anthony, Mary Louise Booth, and Sarah Jane Lippincott, (alias Grace Greenwood). Greatorex and painter Edward Lamson Henry helped to establish the Cragsmoor art colony near Ellenville, New York.

During the 1870s and 1880s, she frequently exhibited her work at the Paris Salon, the National Academy of Design (New York), and at venues in Washington and Boston.

Greatorex died in Paris on February 8, 1897. She and her daughters are buried in the local cemetery at Moret-sur-Loing,

Greatorex's work was included in a 2010 exhibition by the Thomas Cole National Historical Site and Hawthorne Fine Art entitled Remember the Ladies: Women of the Hudson River School.

A definitive biography; Restless Enterprise: The Life and Art of Eliza Pratt Greatorex by Dr. Katherine E. Manthorne was published in 2020 by the University of California Press.

== Publications ==
These books by Greatorex include portfolios of her work.

- Relics of Manhattan: A Series of Photographs from Pen and Ink Sketches Taken on the Spot (1869)
- The Homes of Ober-Ammergau: A Series of Twenty Etchings in Heliotype, from the Original, Pen-and-Ink Drawings, Together with Notes from a Diary (1872)
- Summer Etchings in Colorado (1873)
- Old Landmarks of New York (1874?)
- Old New York, from the Battery to Bloomingdale (1875)
