= Jonathan Greatorex =

British music educator (born 1970)

Greatorex's voice
Recorded in January 2014

Jonathan Greatorex (born 1970) is a British music educator who became nationally known for his involvement in the "Salters Hill Scandal" in Lambeth and has subsequently gone on to become one of the UK's leading consumer rights activists and broadcasters.

== Career ==
He began his professional musical career at the age of 10 as a choral scholar at Llandaff Cathedral. From there, he went on to Christ College before completing his studies at the London College of Music under the tutelage of John McCabe, Michael Goldthorpe and the late Pamela Bowden.

He is an Early Years, Primary and Junior Music Specialist. He has been Head of Music at some of London's leading girls' day schools and has experience from Choral Training to "Music Information Technology". His work with children has been recorded and broadcast on national radio stations.

He was Head of Music at James Allen's Preparatory School in London from where he moved to being Head of Music at Croydon High School Junior Department for 5 years before relocating to Wales in 2007 where he now works full-time as a freelance musical consultant and commercial photographer as well as being a fully qualified Pilot.

He is the author of a new scheme of work for music education, which can be delivered by specialist and non-specialist music teachers from the Foundation Stage to Key Stage 2. He also specialises in composing accessible music for Junior School children and has composed music for several musicals.

== Salters Hill and after ==
He became famous for his legal action against Lambeth Council following the "Salters Hill Scandal" where he exposed a parking scam within the London Borough of Lambeth, estimated to run into hundreds of thousands of pounds. The case against Lambeth ended up with Greatorex recovering £176 of costs in the County Court, following the Parking Adjudicator's ruling that Lambeth had acted "Wholly Unreasonably" in pursuing the case.

He is currently continuing his involvement in consumer rights issues by spearheading the "Light Up Powys" street light campaign, WorkBully, the campaign to put an end to workplace bullying and is now a regular broadcaster for both radio and television on various matters relating to consumer and civil rights.

He lives in North Wales with his wife and daughter.
