= Tim Greatrex =

Tim Greatrex was a non-executive director at TV channel Film 24.

He was previously a consultant for technology company Intrasonics and worked with digital and e-commerce agency Razorfish. In 2001 Greatrex was appointed managing director of Zenith Media UK and oversaw that company's merger with Optimedia to create ZenithOptimedia. He then moved on to become Chairman of Screen Network, taking that business through to its sale to Avanti Screen Media. Greatrex then became chief executive officer of a2a Group Limited, refocusing its interests into broadband television and taking the company through to flotation.
