= William Wallace Wotherspoon (painter) =

American painter

William Wallace Wotherspoon (1821 – Oct. 11, 1888) was an American landscape painter who is known for his paintings of New Hampshire's White Mountains.

== Biography ==
William Wallace Wotherspoon was born in New York City in 1821. Not much is known about his family or education, apart from the fact that his father was a merchant and he took over the business when his father died. He attended the National Academy of Design in the early 1840s and frequently exhibited paintings there over the next four decades. Beginning in 1846, he spent several years traveling around Europe for further informal study of art, much of it in Rome. Paintings from this period of Lake Nemi and ancient Roman ruins were praised by critics.

On his return to the United States, Wotherspoon was elected an associate member of the National Academy of Design, and he became a founding member of the Artists' Fund. The painter Eliza Pratt Greatorex studied with him for a time.

Wotherspoon's style was strongly influenced by the Hudson River School, and many of his earliest American landscapes were views of New Hampshire's White Mountains. He also painted the Litchfield Hills area of Connecticut.

He died in Utica, New York, in 1888.
