= Eleanor Greatorex =

American painter

- Born: May 26, 1853; New York, New York, United States
- Died: April 17, 1908 (aged 54)
- Education: National Academy of Design
- Known for: Floral art Figurative painting

Elizabeth Eleanor Greatorex (May 26, 1853 – April 17, 1908) was an American painter and illustrator.

== Early life ==
Eleanor Greatorex was born in 1853 in New York City. Her mother was Eliza Pratt Greatorex and her sister, Kathleen Honora Greatorex.

== Mid-life and career ==
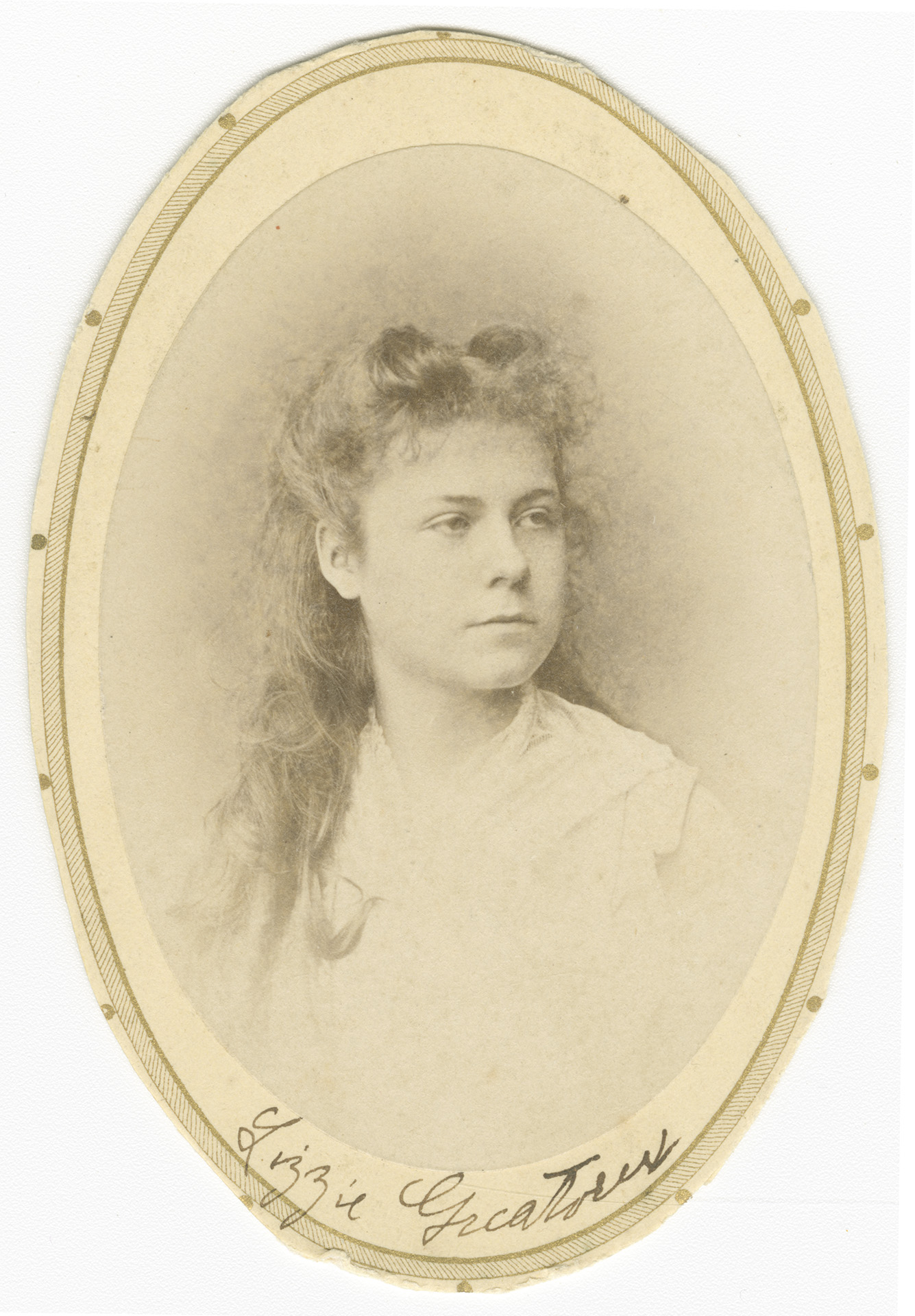
Eleanor Greatorex, c.1874, albumen print, Department of Image Collections, National Gallery of Art Library, Washington, DC

She painted primarily flowers and figurative works. Greatorex attended the National Academy of Design from 1869 until 1870. She was a member of the New York Etching Club. She studied under Carolus-Duran and Jean-Jacques Henner, while in Paris in 1879.

She became sick while working in Algiers in 1881. She returned to New York. After she became well, she traveled again, often with her sister. She had a studio with her mother and sister in New York. She was deaf for most of her life.

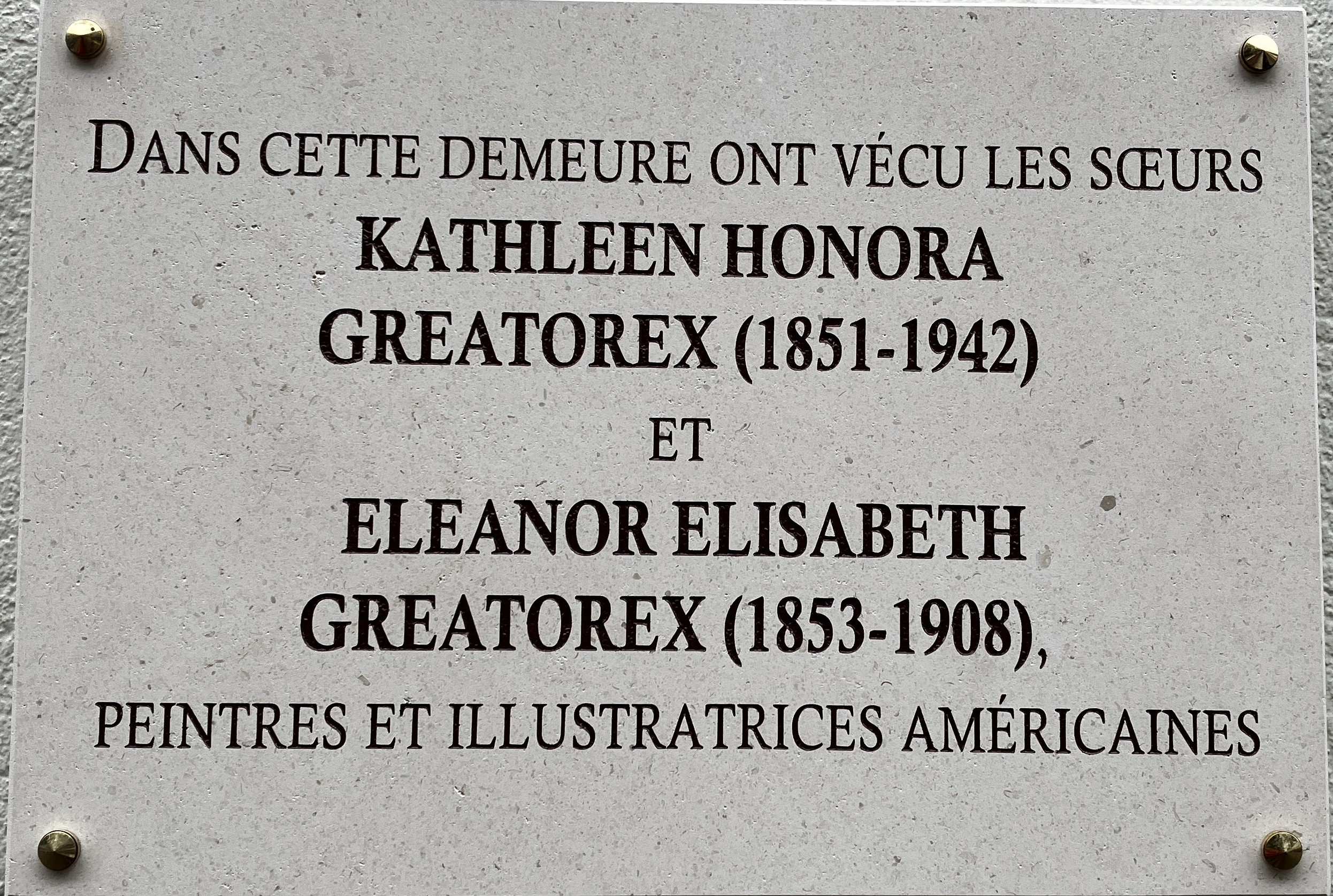

== Death ==
Eleanor Greatorex died on April 17, 1908. She is buried on the Moret-sur-Loing cemetery.

== Notable collections ==
- "Portrait of Mrs. John Gellatly", 1890–1897, oil on wood; Smithsonian American Art Museum
