= Pearcey =

Surname list/disambiguation

Pearcey is a surname. Notable people with the surname include:

- Jason Pearcey (born 1971), former professional footballer
- Mary Pearcey (1866–1890), English woman who was executed for murdering her lover's wife and child
- Nancy Pearcey (born 1952), American author who is a prominent intelligent design proponent and Christian activist
- Trevor Pearcey (1919–1998), British born Australian scientist who created CSIRAC, one of the first stored program electronic computers

== See also ==
- Pearcy
- Pearcey Award, set of prizes presented annually since 1998 by the Pearcey Foundation for achievement in the Australian ICT industry
- Pearcey Foundation, Australian organization dedicated to raising the profile of the Australian ICT industry
- Pearcey integral, class of canonical diffraction integrals
