= Pearcy =

Pearcy may refer to:

- Pearcy, Arkansas, an unincorporated community

== People with the surname ==
- Carl Pearcy, American mathematician
- George Pearcy (1919–1992), American basketball player
- George Etzel Pearcy (1905–2008), American geographer
- Henry Pearcy (1922–2002), American basketball player
- Patricia Pearcy (born 1940), American actress
- Stephen Pearcy (born 1956), American musician
- Stephen Pearcy (activist) (born 1960), American attorney and activist

== See also ==
- Pearcey
- Pearcy v. Stranahan, U.S. Supreme Court case (1907)
