= CSIRAC =

Australia's first digital computer

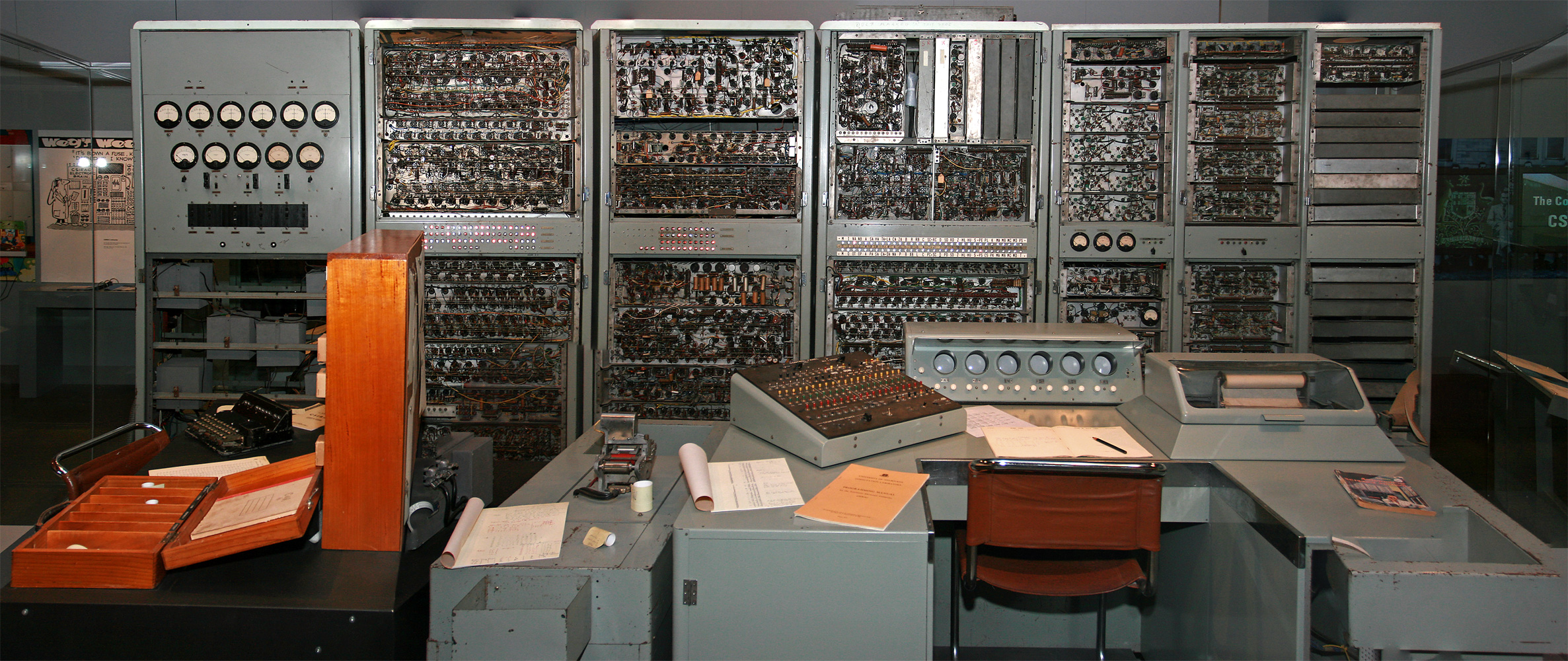
- CSIRAC, Australia's first digital computer, as displayed at the Melbourne Museum
- Also known as: CSIR Mk 1
- Developer: CSIRO
- Type: Digital computer
- Released: c.1949
- Units shipped: 1

CSIRAC (/ˈsaɪræk/; Commonwealth Scientific and Industrial Research Automatic Computer), originally known as CSIR Mk 1, was Australia's first digital computer, and is the fifth stored-program computer in the world. It is the oldest surviving first-generation electronic computer (the Zuse Z4 at the Deutsches Museum is older, but was electro-mechanical, not electronic). It was the first computer to play digital music.

After it was retired, it was exhibited at Melbourne Museum for many years. Later it was relocated to Scienceworks in 2018 and is now on permanent display in the Think Ahead gallery. A comprehensive source of information about the CSIRA collection, its contributors and related topics is available from Museums Victoria on their Collections website.

== History ==
The CSIRAC was constructed by a team led by Trevor Pearcey and Maston Beard, working in large part independently of similar efforts across Europe and the United States, and ran its first test program (multiplication of numbers) sometime in November 1949. It started restricted operation in late 1950 and was publicly demonstrated and operational in 1951.

== Design ==
The machine was fairly representative of first-generation valve-driven computer designs. It used mercury acoustic delay lines as its primary data storage, with a typical capacity of 768 20-bit words, supplemented by a parallel disk-type device with a total 4096-word capacity and an access time of 10 milliseconds. Its memory clock ran at 1000 Hz, and the control unit, synchronized to the clock, took two cycles to execute an instruction (later the speed was doubled to one cycle per instruction). The bus (termed the "digit trunk" in their design) is unusual compared to most computers in that it was serial—it transferred one bit at a time.

Most of CSIRAC's approximately 2000 valves were type 6SN7 triodes, type 6V6 tetrodes, type KT66 tetrodes, and type EA50 diodes. George Semkiw later redesigned the drum-read electronics to use germanium transistors.

Input to the machine was performed in the form of punched 3-inch (76 mm) wide, 12-track paper tape, after experiments with punch cards proved unsatisfactory. The machine was controlled through a console which allowed programs to be stepped through one instruction at a time, and featured CRT displays which showed the contents of registers. Output was through a standard teleprinter or to punch tape.

The instruction set supported the basic set of arithmetic and logical operations, as well as conditional and relative jumps (making it possible to write a library of subroutines). Instructions consisted of three components: a 5-bit "destination" P1-P5, a 5-bit "source" P6-P10, and a 10-bit "address" P11-P20. For instructions that used the main store, the six bits P15-P20 selected one of the 64 logical delay lines. Bits P11-P14 determined the time at which 20 bits of data were written to or extracted from the delay line, and thus represented address of a word within the selected delay line. There were 32 destination gates and 32 source gates; the 10 address bits identified a data word within the store if either the source or destination required access to the store. The total number of source and destination combinations, or different instruction functions, was 1024, although only about 256 of these were used often. The machine had three 20-bit registers (A, B and C), two of which were involved in multiplication, one 10-bit register which could link to either half of a word, and a group of 16 20-bit registers, addressed via bits P11-P14. In addition the 20-bit program counter (S register), and the instruction register (K) were accessible.

The machine, like all machines of the era, had no operating system. A high-level interpreted programming language called INTERPROGRAM was developed in 1960 by Geoff Hill. It was similar to early forms of BASIC, which was designed in 1963 for the 20-bit transistorized GE-200 series.

In 1950 CSIRAC was used to play music, the first known use of a digital computer for the purpose. The music was never recorded, but it has been accurately reconstructed.

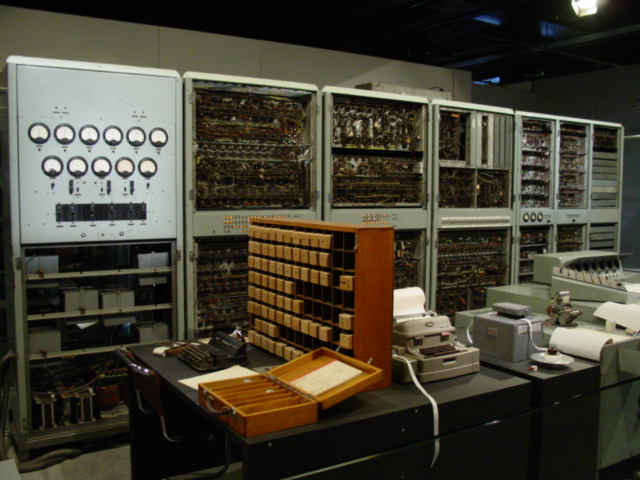
CSIRAC, side view

In 1955, with the CSIRO's decision that computing research was outside its purview, the machine was transferred from its home at the Radiophysics Laboratory at the CSIRO in Sydney, to the University of Melbourne, where it formed Australia's only academic computing facility until late 1956. Many pioneers of computer use in Australia had their first exposure to computing there.

== Preservation ==
In 1964, CSIRAC was shut down for the last time. Its historical significance was already recognised at that stage, and it was placed in storage with plans for its later exhibition in a museum.

The machine was stored in a warehouse through the 1960s and 1970s, before being set up for exhibit at Caulfield Institute of Technology (later the Caulfield Campus of Chisholm Institute of Technology, and later again the Caulfield Campus of Monash University) from 1980 to 1992. It was then returned to storage.

Interest in the machine was revived in the 1990s, as it was realised that many of its developers were ageing and history was being lost forever. A conference about the machine was held in 1996.

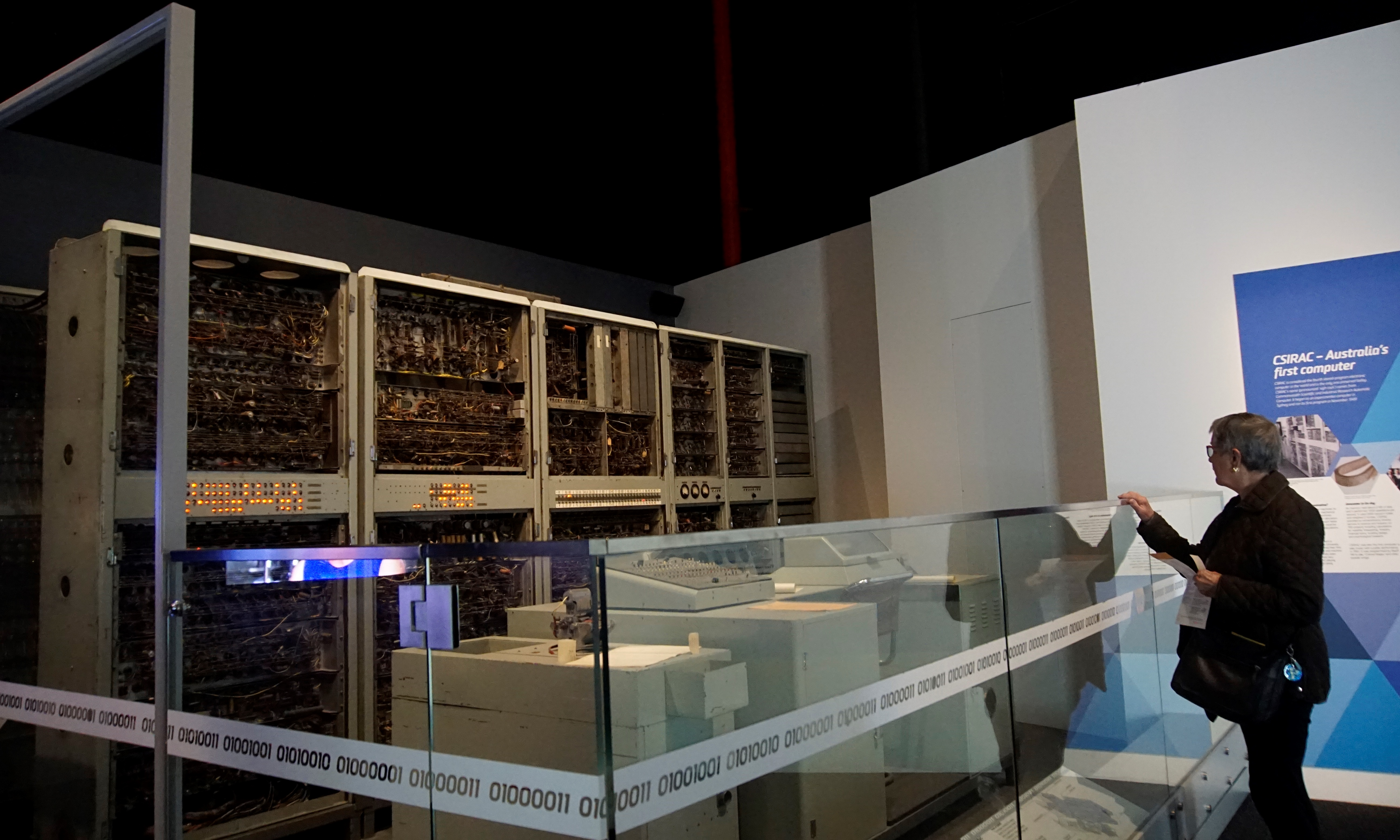
CSIRAC display at Scienceworks

The machine found a permanent home with Museums Victoria in 2000. It has not been operable since its shutdown, but many of the programs that ran on it have been preserved, and an emulator has been written for it. The curators have decided that, aside from the cost of restoring the device, the huge number of repairs that would be required to make it safe to operate (CSIRAC used 30 kilowatts of power in operation) would detract from its historical authenticity.

After being exhibited at Melbourne Museum for many years, it was relocated to Scienceworks in 2018 and is now on permanent display in the Think Ahead gallery.

CSIRAC is listed on the Victorian Heritage Register and is included in a Heritage Overlay.

It is listed as a National Engineering Landmark by Engineers Australia as part of its Engineering Heritage Recognition Program.

== Legacy ==
In 2025, Australian electronic DJ and music producer Ninajirachi released the song "CSIRAC", paying tribute to the computer, on her debut album I Love My Computer.

== See also ==
- Computer music
- Electronic music
- History of computing hardware
- List of vacuum-tube computers
- SILLIAC – Sydney University's second computer
