= Trevor Pearcey =

Australian scientist (1919-1998)

Trevor Pearcey (5 March 1919 – 27 January 1998) was a British-born Australian scientist, who created CSIRAC, one of the first stored-program electronic computers in the world.

Born in Woolwich, London, he graduated from Imperial College in 1940 with first class honours in physics and mathematics. He emigrated to Australia in 1945.

In a 1948 paper, published in the Australian Journal of Science, he envisaged using a digital electronic computer for providing information over a national telecommunications network:

It is not inconceivable that an automatic encyclopedic service operated through the national teleprinter or telephone system, will one day exist.

He bet that he could make an electronic device that would be 1000 times faster than the best electronic device of the time. One of his calculators filled a small room, weighing 7 tons.

He was awarded a D.Sc. by the University of Melbourne in 1971.

In his later years he lived on the Mornington Peninsula near Melbourne.

The Pearcey Foundation and the Pearcey Award for outstanding achievement by an Australian in the ICT industry are named after him.

== See also ==
- Pearcey integral
