= Department of Computer Science, University of Manchester =

Department formed in 1964

Coordinates: 53.4676°N 2.2343°W

Department of Computer Science
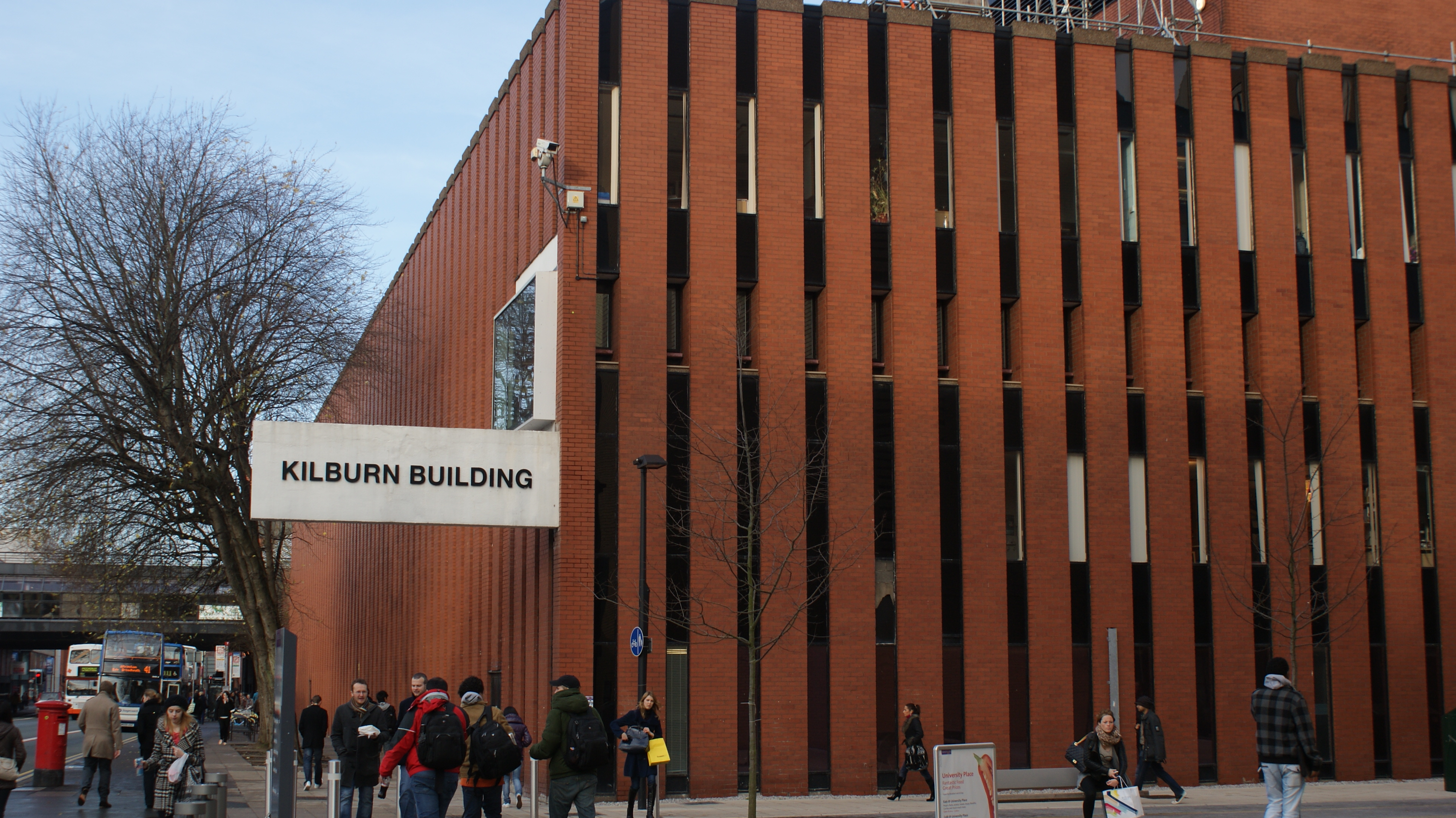
- The Department of Computer Science is based in the Kilburn Building on Oxford Road
- Former names: Computer Group (until 1964); Department of Computer Science (1964–2004); School of Computer Science (2004–2019)
- Established: 1964, with history back to 1947
- Affiliations: Faculty of Engineering and Physical Sciences, University of Manchester
- Head of Department: Andrew J. Stewart
- Students: 1500+
- Location: Manchester, England
- Known for: Manchester Baby; Manchester computers Virtual memory Manchester code AMULET microprocessor SpiNNaker; Apache Taverna; Vampire (theorem prover)
- Website: cs.manchester.ac.uk

The Department of Computer Science at the University of Manchester, England is the longest established department of Computer Science in the United Kingdom and one of the largest. It is located in the Kilburn Building on the Oxford Road and currently has over 1500 students taking a wide range of undergraduate and postgraduate courses and 60 full-time academic staff.

== Teaching and study ==
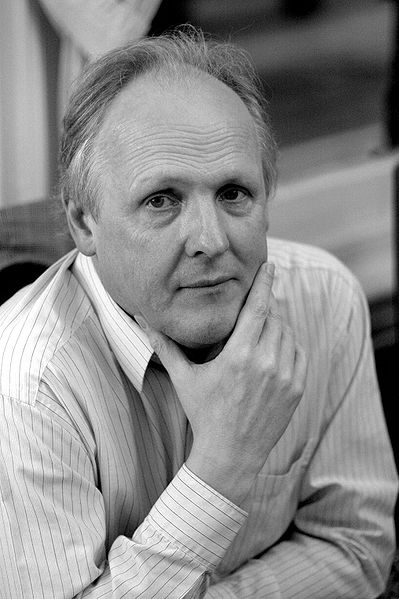
Steve Furber works on the SpiNNaker and the Human Brain Project

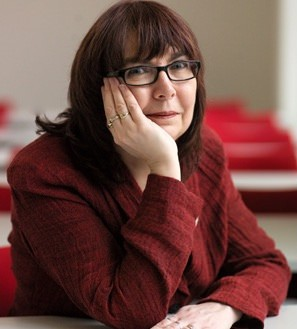
Carole Goble is a Professor of Computer Science

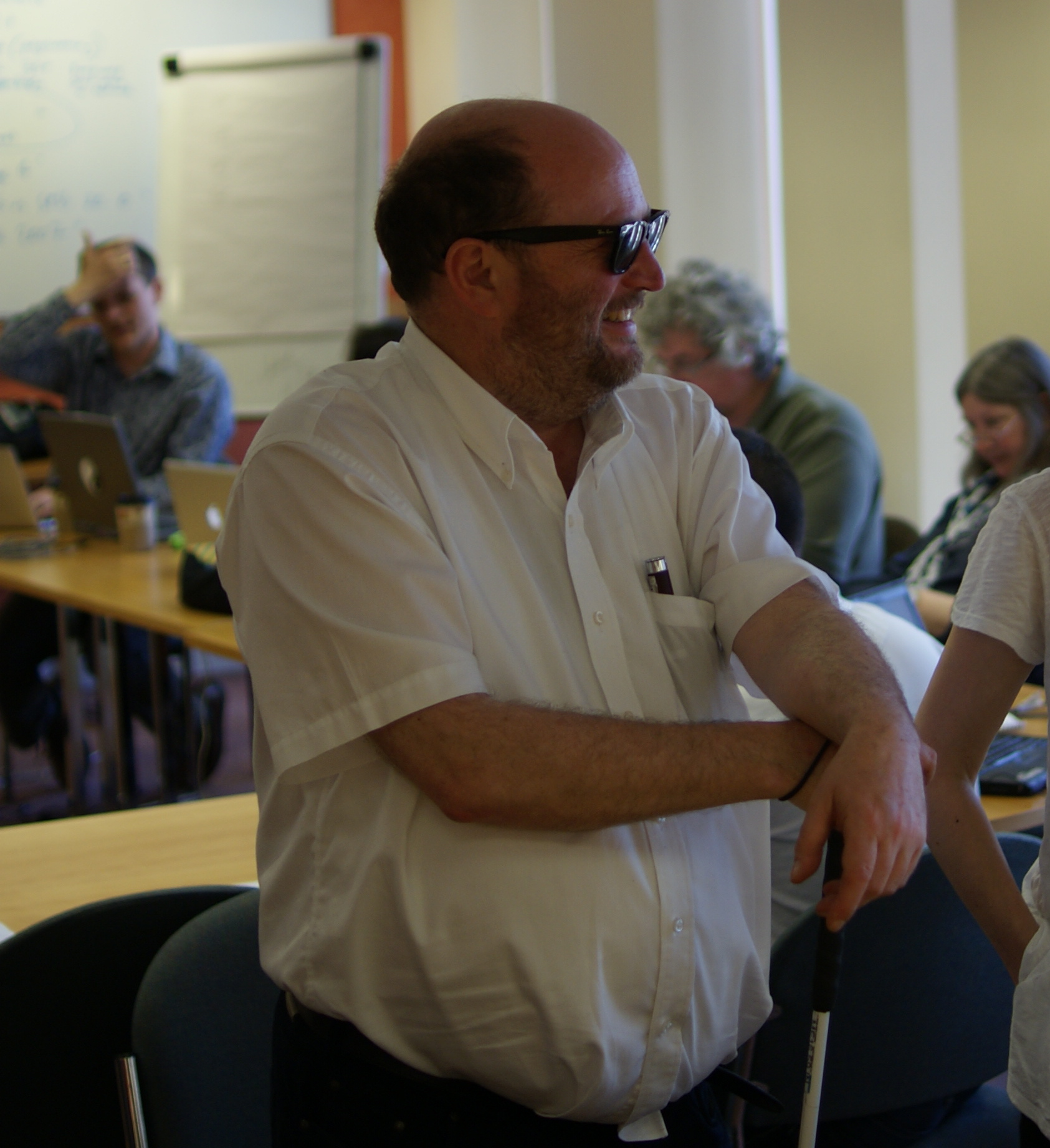
Robert Stevens has served head of school/department since 2016

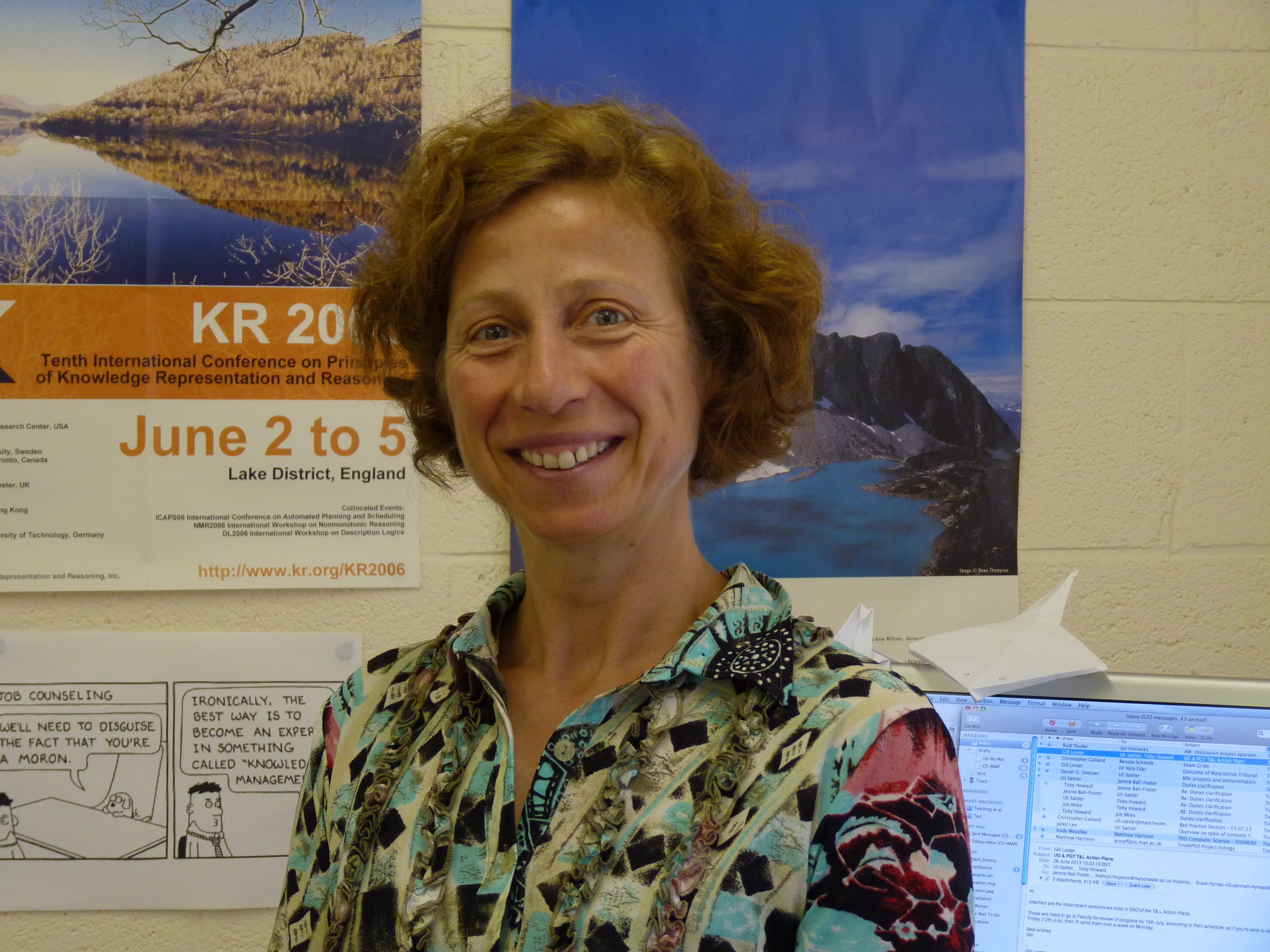
Ulrike Sattler research investigates knowledge representation and reasoning

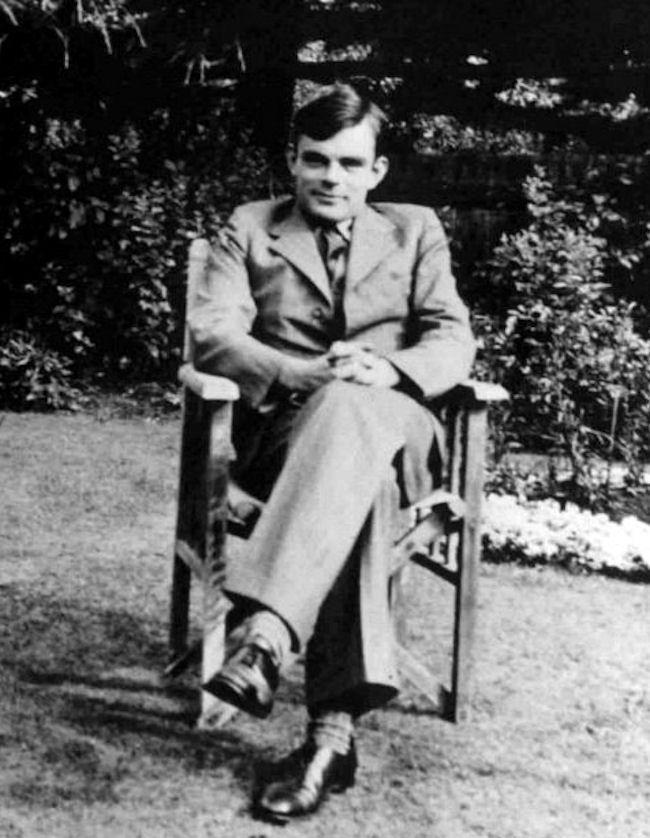
Alan Turing was deputy director of the computing laboratory, a predecessor to the Department of Computer Science

=== Undergraduate ===
As of 2026 the Department offers two Bachelor of Science (BSc) degrees for undergraduate students:

1. BSc (Hons) Computer Science, with (or without) Industrial Experience (IE)
2. BSc (Hons) Computer Science and Mathematics, with (or without) Industrial Experiencee (IE)

Degrees with IE take four years to complete, where degrees without take three.

=== Postgraduate ===
At postgraduate level the department offers taught Master of Science (MSc) degrees, at an advanced level and also through a foundation route. Research degrees, Doctor of Philosophy (PhD) and Master of Philosophy (MPhil) are available as three and four year programmes through the Doctoral Training Centre in Computer Science, the first of its kind in the UK.

== Notable academic staff ==
Notable academic staff include:

- Andy Brass
- Jack Dongarra
- Steve Furber
- Carole Goble
- Toby Howard
- Norman Paton
- Steve Pettifer
- Ulrike Sattler
- Robert Stevens
- Chris J. Taylor
- Andrei Voronkov

The School is organised into nine different research groups, which received funding from a wide range of sources including the European Union, Engineering and Physical Sciences Research Council and Biotechnology and Biological Sciences Research Council.

=== Advanced Processor Technologies ===
The Advanced Processor Technologies (APT) group researches advanced and novel approaches to processing and computation and is led by Professor Steve Furber. New projects include SpiNNaker, Transactional Memory, and TERAFLUX. Academic staff in the group include Mikel Luján Past research projects include Jamaica, AMULET microprocessor, Network On Chip, Asynchronous Digital signal processors and System on a chip.

=== Bio-Health Informatics ===
The Bio-Health Informatics Group (BHIG) conducts research in Bioinformatics and Health informatics ranging from the applications in molecular biology through to clinical e-science and healthcare applications. Academic staff in the group include Andy Brass and Robert Stevens.

=== Formal Methods ===
The Formal Methods group has a very broad span of interests, ranging from developing the new mathematics of computational behaviour, to the study and development of system design and verification methods. There is a large group dedicated to the automation of logic including world-champion Vampire. The group is led by Michael Fisher (computer scientist) and includes Peter Aczel, Andrei Voronkov, Howard Barringer amongst more than a dozen staff and a large number of research students.

=== Information Management ===
The Information Management Group (IMG) conducts basic and applied research into the design, development and use of data and knowledge management systems. Such research activities are broad in nature as well as scope, including basic research on models and languages that underpin activities on algorithms, technologies and architectures. Challenging applications motivate and validate this research, in particular the Semantic Web and e-Science. Examples of recent research include Protégé, Utopia Documents, myGrid, Taverna workbench, myExperiment, Open PHACTS. Academic staff in group include Carole Goble, Norman Paton, Ulrike Sattler, Robert Stevens, Sean Bechhofer, Suzanne Embury, Caroline Jay and Bijan Parsia.

=== Machine Learning and Optimisation ===
The Machine Learning and Optimisation (MLO) group conduct research into a wide range of techniques and applications of machine learning, optimization, data mining, probabilistic modelling, pattern recognition and machine perception. Academic staff include Jon Shapiro (group leader).

=== Nano Engineering and Storage Technologies ===
The Nano Engineering and Storage Technologies (NEST) group has research interests in nano fabrication for data storage and advanced sensors applications and the investigation of data storage systems in general. The NEST group is housed in an integrated suite of staff offices, general-purpose laboratory space and class 100/1000 cleanrooms and is a founder member of the Manchester Centre for Mesoscience and Nanotechnology where the ground-breaking, Nobel Prize–winning work on graphene by Andre Geim and Konstantin Novoselov was undertaken. The group is led by Thomas Thomson, academic staff members include Jim Miles.

=== Software Systems ===
The Software Systems group is concerned with the design, modelling, simulation and construction of mission-critical systems that challenge the states-of-the-art in both software engineering and performance engineering. Such systems are fundamentally composed of physically distributed component sub-systems, and are characterised by large data spaces and high compute needs, with associated complex interactions between the components. Academic staff members include John Keane.

=== Text Mining ===
The Text Mining group performs research to extract useful information and knowledge from unstructured text, particularly in the field of bioinformatics. The group also performs research into Natural Language Processing (NLP) and hosts the National Centre for Text Mining. The group is led by Sophia Ananiadou and includes academic members Jun'ichi Tsujii, John McNaught (retired) and Goran Nenadic.

=== Advanced Interfaces ===
The Advanced Interfaces Group (AIG) researches virtual environments, collaborative visualization systems, and computer vision. The group is led by Steve Pettifer and includes academic staff Toby Howard (Honorary Reader). Research projects include UTOPIA software.

=== Imaging Science ===
The Imaging sciences is part of the Centre for Imaging Sciences, a research department focusing on imaging physics, image processing, computer vision, and the development and application of imaging biomarkers in healthcare. The group is run by Chris J. Taylor jointly with the School of Medicine.

== Management ==
The school (and department) has been led by ten different Heads of School since its inception in 1964.

=== Heads of Department and Heads of School ===
The Department of Computer Science (in 2018, the School of Computer Science was turned into the Department of Computer Science) has been run by

1. Andrew J. Stewart

The School of Computer Science (2004–2018) was run by

1. Robert Stevens 2016–2022
2. Jim Miles 2011–2016
3. Norman Paton 2008–2011
4. Chris J. Taylor 2004–2008

Prior to merger with UMIST, the School of Computer Science was the Department of Computer Science. It was run by

1. Steve Furber 2001–2004
2. Brian Warboys 1996–2001
3. Howard Barringer 1991–1996
4. John Gurd 1987–1991
5. Dai Edwards 1980–1987
6. Tom Kilburn 1964–1980

== History ==
The school has its roots in the Computer Group of the Electrical Engineering Department at the Victoria University of Manchester. The Computer Group was established following Freddie Williams's move to the Electrical Engineering Department in 1946. At its formation in 1964, the Department of Computer Science was the first such department in the United Kingdom, with Professor Tom Kilburn serving as Head of Department until 1980. On 1 May 2001, following the death of Kilburn the same year, the Computer Building was renamed Kilburn Building in his honour. The School of Computer Science was formed from the Department when the Victoria University of Manchester and UMIST merged to form the University of Manchester in 2004. It changed back from a school to a department in 2019. The Group/School/Department is notable for the following achievements:

- The world's first electronic stored-program digital computer (the Manchester Baby)
- Virtual memory using paging (see Atlas Computer)
- Manchester encoding
- The AMULET microprocessor series (asynchronous implementations of the ARM computer architecture)

See also the History of the school.

=== Alumni and emeritus ===
The school and department has several notable alumni and Emeritus staff including:

- Victoria Stavridou-Coleman, Chief Scientist of the United States Air Force
- Terri Attwood, Emeritus Professor
- Alan Rector, Emeritus Professor
- Jim Miles (retired August 2019)
- Allan M. Ramsay (retired)
- Ian Horrocks, Professor of Computer Science at the University of Oxford
- Hilary Kahn, a professor in the computer science department
- Tom Kilburn first head of the Department of Computer Science
- Joshua Knowles, Professor at the University of Birmingham
- Pedro Mendes, Professor at the University of Connecticut Health Center
- Magnus Rattray, Professor of Computational and Systems Biology in the School of Biological Sciences
- Neil Lawrence, DeepMind Professor of machine learning at the University of Cambridge
- Alan Turing was deputy director of the computing laboratory and a Reader in the Mathematics Department
- Brian Warboys, Professor
- Freddie Williams
- Geoff Tootill
- Nandini Mukherjee
- Ross D. King, creator of Robot Scientist, Department of Chemical Engineering and Biotechnology, University of Cambridge
- Simon Segars CEO of Arm Ltd.
