= Steve Furber =

English computer scientist (born 1953)

Steve Furber CBE FRS FREng
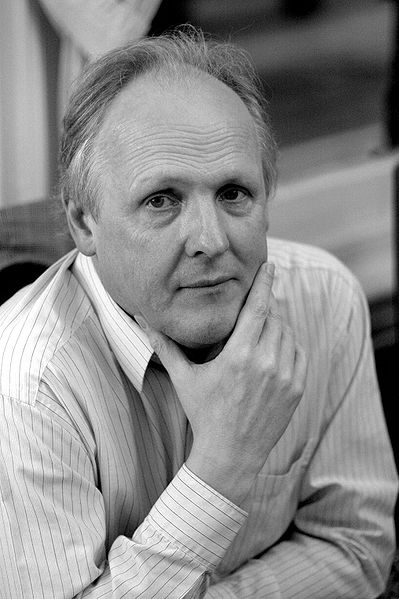
- Furber in 2009
- Born: Stephen Byram Furber; 21 March 1953 (age 73); Manchester, England
- Education: Manchester Grammar School
- Alma mater: University of Cambridge (BA, MMath, PhD)
- Known for: Acorn Computers; ARM architecture; BBC Micro; SpiNNaker; Human Brain Project; ARM System–on–Chip Architecture
- Spouse: Valerie Margaret Elliott (m. 1977)
- Awards: Charles Stark Draper Prize (2022); Mullard Award (2016); DFBCS (2014); Lovelace Medal (2014); Pinkerton Lecture (2010); Millennium Technology Prize (2010); Faraday Medal (2007); Royal Society Wolfson Research Merit Award (2004)
- Scientific career
- Fields: Neural Networks; Networks on Chip; Microprocessors
- Institutions: University of Manchester; University of Cambridge; Acorn Computers
- Thesis: Is the Weis-Fogh principle exploitable in turbomachines? (1979)
- Doctoral advisor: John Ffowcs Williams
- Notable students: Simon Segars
- Website: research.manchester.ac.uk/en/persons/steve.furber

Stephen Byram Furber (born 21 March 1953) is an English computer scientist, mathematician and hardware engineer, and Emeritus ICL Professor of Computer Engineering in the Department of Computer Science at the University of Manchester, UK. After completing his education at the University of Cambridge (BA, MMath, PhD), he spent the 1980s at Acorn Computers, where he was a principal designer of the BBC Micro and the ARM 32-bit RISC microprocessor. As of 2023, over 250 billion ARM chips have been manufactured, powering much of the world's mobile computing and embedded systems, everything from sensors to smartphones to servers.

In 1990, he moved to Manchester to lead research into asynchronous circuits, low-power electronics and neural engineering, where the Spiking Neural Network Architecture (SpiNNaker) project is delivering a computer incorporating a million ARM processors optimised for computational neuroscience.

== Education ==
Furber was educated at Manchester Grammar School and represented the UK in the International Mathematical Olympiad in Hungary in 1970 winning a bronze medal. He went on to study the Mathematical Tripos as an undergraduate student of St John's College, Cambridge, receiving a Bachelor of Arts (BA) and Master of Mathematics (MMath – Part III of the Mathematical Tripos) degrees. In 1978, he was appointed a Rolls-Royce research fellow in aerodynamics at Emmanuel College, Cambridge and was awarded a PhD in 1980 for research on the fluid dynamics of the Weis-Fogh mechanism supervised by John Ffowcs Williams. During his PhD in the late 1970s, Furber worked on a voluntary basis for Hermann Hauser and Chris Curry within the fledging Acorn Computers (originally the Cambridge Processor Unit), on a number of projects; notably a microprocessor based fruit machine controller, and the Proton – the initial prototype version of what was to become the BBC Micro, in support of Acorn's tender for the BBC Computer Literacy Project.

== Career and research ==
In 1981, following the completion of his PhD and the award of the BBC contract to Acorn computers, Furber joined Acorn where he was a Hardware Designer and then Design Manager. He was involved in the final design and production of the BBC Micro and later, the Acorn Electron, and the ARM microprocessor. In August 1990 he moved to the University of Manchester to become the International Computers Limited (ICL) Professor of Computer Engineering and established the AMULET microprocessor research group.

Furber's main research interests are in neural networks, networks on chip and microprocessors. In 2003, Furber was a member of the EPSRC research cluster in biologically inspired novel computation. On 16 September 2004, he gave a speech on Hardware Implementations of Large-scale Neural Networks as part of the initiation activities of the Alan Turing Institute.

Furber's most recent project SpiNNaker, is an attempt to build a new kind of computer that directly mimics the workings of the human brain. Spinnaker is an artificial neural network realised in hardware, a massively parallel processing system eventually designed to incorporate a million ARM processors. The finished Spinnaker will model 1 per cent of the human brain's capability, or around 1 billion neurons. The Spinnaker project aims amongst other things to investigate:

- How can massively parallel computing resources accelerate our understanding of brain function?
- How can our growing understanding of brain function point the way to more efficient parallel, fault-tolerant computation?

Furber believes that "significant progress in either direction will represent a major scientific breakthrough". Furber's research interests include asynchronous systems, ultra-low-power processors for sensor networks, on-chip interconnect and globally asynchronous locally synchronous (GALS), and neural systems engineering.

His research has been funded by the Engineering and Physical Sciences Research Council (EPSRC), Royal Society and the European Research Council (ERC).

=== Awards and honours ===
In February 1997, Furber was elected a Fellow of the British Computer Society. In 1998, he became a member of the European Working Group on Asynchronous Circuit Design (ACiD-WG). He was elected a Fellow of the Royal Society (FRS) in 2002 and was Specialist Adviser to the House of Lords Science and Technology Select Committee inquiry into microprocessor technology.

Furber was elected a Fellow of the Royal Academy of Engineering (FREng), the Institute of Electrical and Electronics Engineers (IEEE) in 2005 and a Fellow of the Institution of Engineering and Technology (FIET). He is a Chartered Engineer (CEng). In September 2007 he was awarded the Faraday Medal and in 2010 he gave the Pinkerton Lecture.

Furber was appointed Commander of the Order of the British Empire (CBE) in the 2008 New Year Honours and was elected as one of the three laureates of Millennium Technology Prize in 2010 (with Richard Friend and Michael Grätzel), for development of ARM processor. In 2012, Furber was made a Fellow of the Computer History Museum "for his work, with Sophie Wilson, on the BBC Micro computer and the ARM processor architecture."

In 2004 he was awarded a Royal Society Wolfson Research Merit Award. In 2014, he was made a Distinguished Fellow at the British Computer Society (DFBCS) recognising his contribution to the IT profession and industry. Furber's nomination for the Royal Society reads:

Professor Furber is distinguished for his fundamental contributions to the design and analysis of electronic systems, especially microprocessors. He was the original designer of the hardware architecture of the ARM processor, the world's leading embedded processor core and a major engineering and commercial success for the United Kingdom. Having moved to Manchester University, he established a research team to investigate asynchronous processor design, which rapidly made fundamental contributions to the field. He has shown how to combine academic design theories with practical engineering constraints to achieve a remarkable and elegant synthesis. His work demonstrates in particular how to design microprocessors with low power and low radio frequency emissions, necessary for future wireless applications. Furber has designed a series of highly original asynchronous processors to execute the ARM instruction set. These have been fabricated and subjected to extensive experimental analysis. Furber's group is the world's leading centre of research in both fundamental theory and engineering implementation of such devices.

In 2009, Unsworth Academy (formerly called Castlebrook High School) in Manchester introduced a house system, with Furber being one of the four houses. On 15 October 2010, Furber officially opened the Independent Learning Zone in Unsworth Academy. In 2012, a building at Radbroke Hall was named in his honour by Barclays Bank.

In 2022, he was awarded the Charles Stark Draper Prize by the National Academy of Engineering of the United States of America alongside John L. Hennessy, David A. Patterson and Sophie M. Wilson for contributions to the invention, development, and implementation of reduced instruction set computer (RISC) chips. Furber was played by actor Sam Philips in the BBC Four documentary drama Micro Men, first aired on 8 October 2009.

The Furber Chair in Computer Systems Engineering at the University of Manchester is named in his honour. As of 2025 this is held by André van Schaik.

== Personal life ==
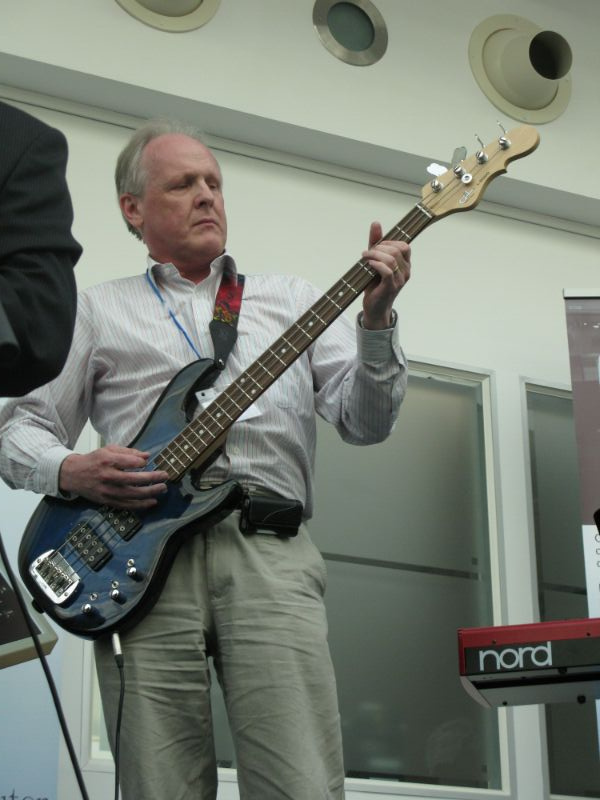
Furber playing bass guitar

Furber is married to Valerie Elliott with two daughters, 3 grandchildren and plays bass guitar.

Academic offices
Preceded by Brian Warboys	Head of the Department of Computer Science, University of Manchester; 2001–2004	Succeeded by Chris J. Taylor
