= Jim Miles =

Jim Miles may refer to:

- Jim Miles (politician) (born 1941), politician
- Jim Miles (baseball) (born 1943), pitcher in Major League Baseball
- James John Miles (born 1959), Professor of Computer engineering at the University of Manchester

== See also ==
- James Miles (disambiguation)
