= Fundageek =

FundaGeek was a crowd funding resource designed for funding project involving technology, scientific research, inventions and community support. Funding was provided through backers who make pledges in return for rewards provided by the project owners. Fundageek did not regard crowd funding as an investment or a debt instrument, and pledges did not involve any form of equity interest. The April 2012 US JOBS Act opened up the prospects for "equity crowdfunding", although the SEC had not defined the required rules for participation, which was expected in 2013.

From 20 September 2013 the content of the FundaGeek web site was replaced by an offer to sell the domain and underlying technology. An archived copy from August 25, 2013, is available at the Internet Archive.

== Founders ==
FundaGeek was soft-launched in November 2011 by co-founders Cary Harwin (President) and Daniel Gutierrez (CEO). Harwin is a graduate of CSUN with BS in Accounting/Law and co-founder of the software development company Catalyst Development Corporation. Gutierrez graduated from UCLA with BS in Mathematics and Computer Science. Prior to his CEO appointment at Fundageek, Gutierrez was CEO of AMULET Development Corp. and served for 18 years as an instructor for the Business and Management department of UCLA Extension. He is also author of three computer industry books and served as technical editor for Data Based Advisor Magazine.

== Model ==
Only some FundaGeek projects used the "all or nothing" funding model adopted by many other crowdfunding sites. Such a model only applied to commercial, for-profit Fundageek projects, which must have reached their goal amount by the end of the campaign period in order to get any funding. Funding for scientific research and community support projects received whatever funding the project has attracted by the end of the campaign period.

There was no charge to submit a project for consideration on FundaGeek. Upon the successful funding of a project at the end of the campaign period, FundaGeek initiated a process whereby PayPal processed all pledge transactions. At this time, the project owner received the project funding in the PayPal verified account associated with the FundaGeek account, less PayPal's processing fee (2-3%) and FundaGeek's fee of either 5% of the total funds raised for Standard Marketing Resources, or 9% for Premium Marketing Resources.
