= Norman Paton =

British computer scientist

Norman Paton MAE
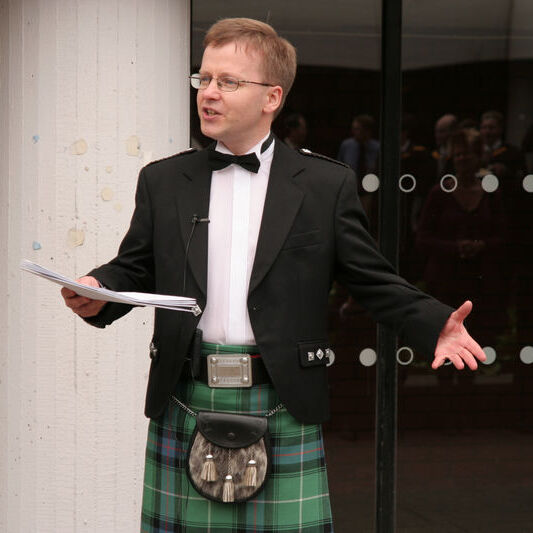
- Norman Paton speaking in the Kilburn Building at the University of Manchester
- Born: Norman William Paton
- Education: University of Aberdeen
- Known for: Active databases; Object databases
- Scientific career
- Fields: Information integration; Query processing; Life science data management
- Workplaces: University of Manchester; Heriot-Watt University; University of Aberdeen
- Thesis: A Prolog implementation of an object-oriented database system (1989)
- Doctoral advisor: Peter M. D. Gray
- Website: research.manchester.ac.uk/en/persons/norman.paton

Norman William Paton MAE is a Professor in the Department of Computer Science at the University of Manchester in the UK. Previously he co-lead the Information Management Group (IMG) with Carole Goble and served as head of department from 2008 to 2011.

== Education ==
Paton was educated at the University of Aberdeen where he was awarded a first class Bachelor of Science degree in Computing Science in 1986 and a PhD in 1989 for research into object-oriented database systems using Prolog supervised by Peter Gray.

== Research and career ==
Paton's research interests are in distributed information management including dataspaces, query processing in wireless sensor networks, autonomic computing, workflow management, and data management for systems biology. His research has been funded by the Engineering and Physical Sciences Research Council (EPSRC), the Biotechnology and Biological Sciences Research Council (BBSRC) and the European Union.

Paton has also been active in the Open Grid Forum (OGF), Proteomics Standards Initiative (PSI) and the Manchester Centre for Integrative Systems Biology (MCISB).

Paton has taught on several database courses at undergraduates and postgraduate level. Paton has had a variety of roles in the School of Computer Science including director of the research school, director of teaching strategy, and head of school from November 2008 to November 2011.

=== Awards and honours ===
Paton was awarded Membership of the Academia Europaea (MAE) for sustained academic excellence in 2018.

Academic offices
Preceded by Chris J. Taylor	Head of the School of Computer Science, University of Manchester; 2008–2011	Succeeded by Jim Miles
