= Steve Pettifer =

British computer scientist (born 1970)

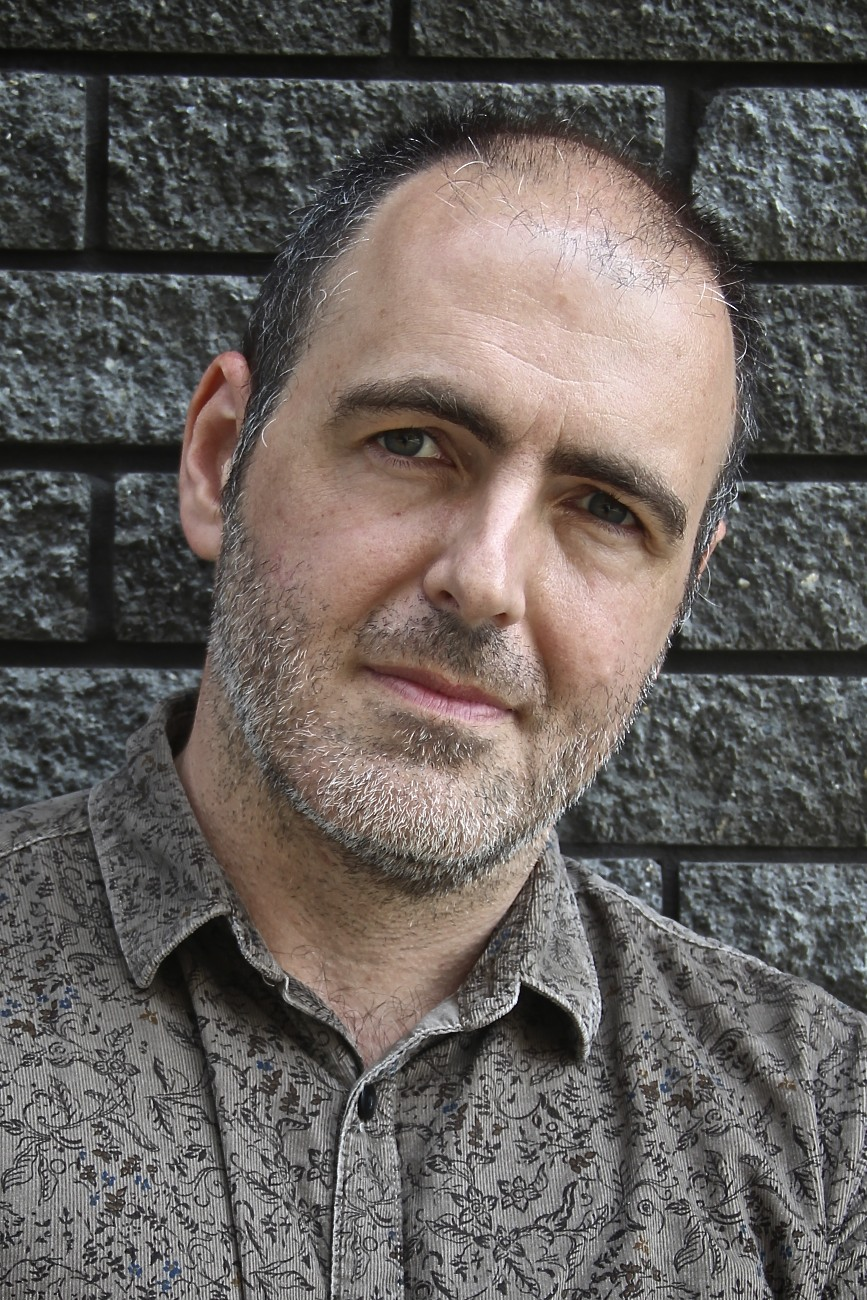
- Born: Stephen Robert Pettifer; September 21, 1970 (age 56)
- Education: University of Manchester
- Known for: UTOPIA (Bioinformatics tools); Utopia Documents
- Scientific career
- Fields: Visualisation; Bioinformatics; Computer Graphics; Semantic Publishing
- Workplaces: University of Manchester; Lost Island Labs Ltd.
- Thesis: An operating environment for large scale virtual reality (1999)
- Doctoral advisor: Adrian West
- Website: aig.cs.man.ac.uk/people/srp www.manchester.ac.uk/research/steve.pettifer

Stephen Robert Pettifer (born September 21, 1970) is a Professor in the Department of Computer Science at the University of Manchester in England.

== Education ==
Pettifer completed his Bachelor of Science degree and PhD in the Department of Computer Science, and work on virtual reality under the supervision of Adrian West in 1999.

== Research and career ==
Pettifer's research interests are centred on the design of advanced interfaces for computer systems, in particular: scientific visualisation, scholarly publishing, and virtual reality. His main research project revolves around Utopia Documents, a novel tool for interacting with the scientific literature.

He is a co-author of the bioinformatics textbook Bioinformatics Challenges at the Interface of Biology and Computer Science: Mind the Gap with Terri Attwood and Dave Thorne.

As of 2017 Pettifer teaches on part of the Advanced Computer Graphics course and Fundamentals of Distributed Systems.
