= James Miles =

James or Jimmy Miles may refer to:

- James John Miles (born 1959), British academic
- James Albert Miles (1871–1953), inspector of schools in Western Australia
- Boobie Miles (born 1970), high school football tail back, primary subject in the book Friday Night Lights: A Town, a Team, and a Dream
- James Miles, journalist (see 2008 Tibetan unrest)
- James Miles, politician in Minnesota gubernatorial election, 1974
- Jimmy Miles (born 1967), American musician
- Jimmy Miles (baseball), American baseball player

== See also ==
- Jim Miles (disambiguation)
- James Myles (1877–1956), Irish soldier, politician and rugby union player
