= University Place =

University Place may refer to:

- University Place (Chapel Hill, North Carolina), a shopping mall formerly known as University Mall
- University Place, Manchester, at the University of Manchester
- University Place (Manhattan), a street in Manhattan, New York City
- University Place (Orem, Utah)
- University Place, Washington, a city in the State of Washington
