= James John Miles =

English academic

Jim Miles
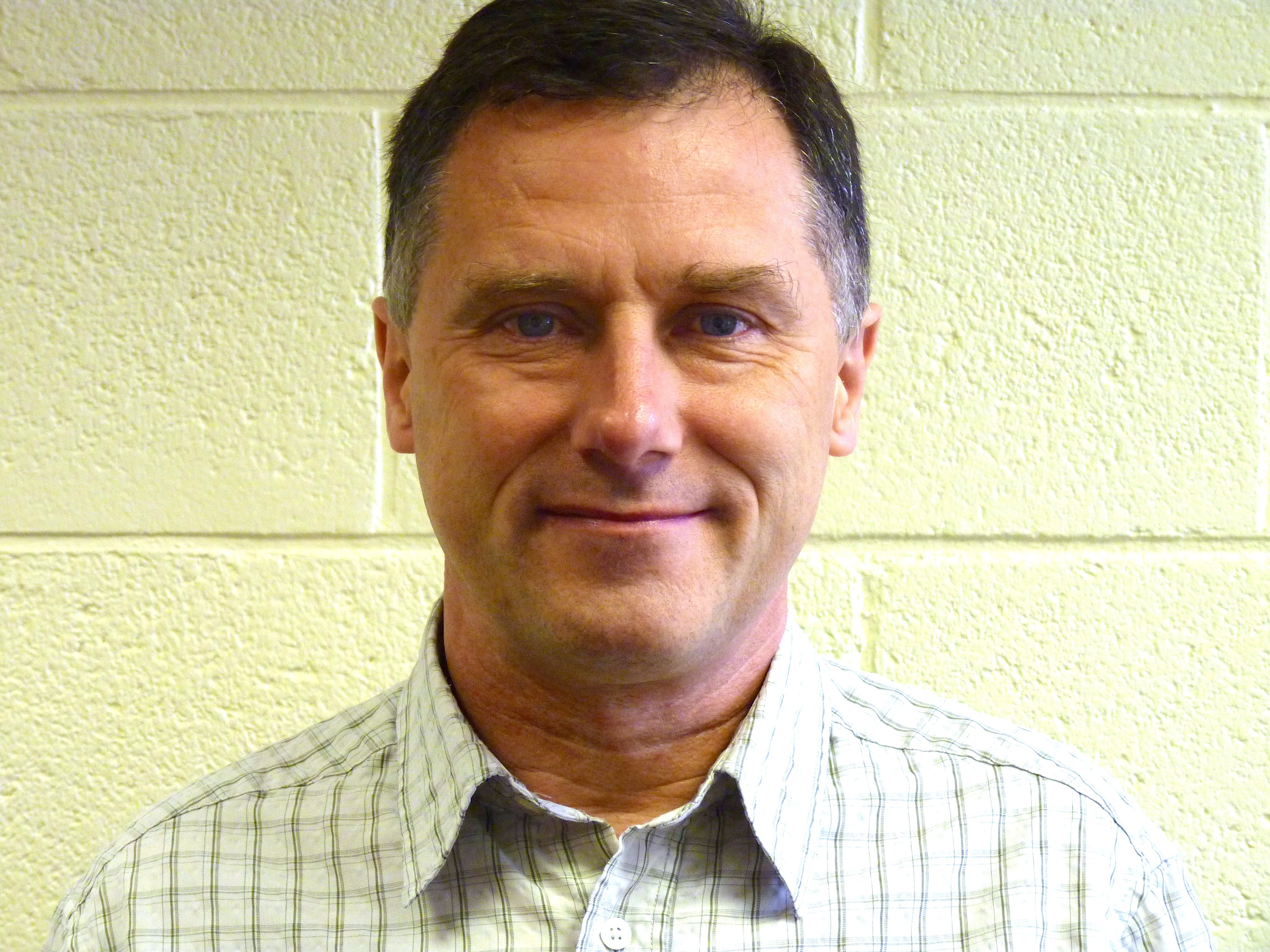
- Born: James John Miles; 7 February 1959 (age 67)
- Education: University of Liverpool
- Scientific career
- Workplaces: University of Manchester; University of Salford; Met Office; The BOC Group; Manchester Polytechnic; University of Liverpool
- Thesis: Information storage on thin film media (1990)
- Website: manchester.ac.uk/research/jim.miles

James John Miles (born 1959) is a retired Professor of Computer Engineering in the School of Computer Science at the University of Manchester where he previously was head of the school and a member of the Nano Engineering & Storage Technology Research Group (NEST).

== Education ==
Miles graduated with a first class honours degree in Physics from the University of Liverpool in 1980. Following this he completed a Master of Science in Computational physics from the University of Salford in 1987 and PhD in Electrical and Electronic Engineering from the University of Manchester in 1990.

== Research ==
Miles has worked at the Meteorological Office modelling the formation of storm clouds and completed research in novel anaesthetic delivery systems for BOC Medishield, now Datex Ohmeda. Since 1987 he has worked in Department of Electrical and Electronic Engineering, Manchester School of Engineering and the School of Computer Science at the University of Manchester.

His research interests are in magnetic materials for data storage purposes, including micromagnetic modelling of thin magnetic films for hard disks. He is involved in the Information Storage Industry Consortium (INSIC) Extremely High Density Recording (EHDR) programme, determining the architecture and design of future 1 Terabit per square inch hard disk products and beyond.

His research is done in collaboration with academic and industrial research groups, including Hitachi Global Storage Technologies (HGST), San Jose, California and Seagate Research, Pittsburgh, USA.

=== Research funding ===
Miles research has been funded by the Engineering and Physical Sciences Research Council., European Union and INSIC. He has been involved in obtaining grant funding in excess of £3 million of which £1.6 million is in grants or awards for which he was the principal applicant. Miles is also a member of one of the groups that secured Science Research Investment Fund (SRIF) for the £1.8M Manchester Centre for Mesoscience and Nanotechnology.

Jim Miles served as Head of the School of Computer Science from November 2011 till July 2016. He retired from The University of Manchester in August 2019.

== Other activities ==
In the University, Miles was Associate Dean for Graduate Education in the Faculty of Engineering and Physical Sciences from 2008 to 2011. He has supervised several PhD students via the Doctoral Training Centre, the first of its kind in the UK.

In August 2017, he was responsible for the discovery of a previously-unknown collection of Alan Turing letters in an old filing cabinet at the University of Manchester.

Previously Miles has been an editor of Journal of Magnetism and Magnetic Materials and a Guest Editor of IEEE Transactions on Magnetics.

Academic offices
Preceded by Norman Paton	Head of the School of Computer Science, University of Manchester; 2011–2016	Succeeded by Robert Stevens
