= Tom Kilburn =

British computer scientist (1921–2001)

Tom Kilburn CBE FRS
- Kilburn in 1962
- Born: 11 August 1921; Dewsbury, Yorkshire, England
- Died: 17 January 2001 (aged 79); Manchester, England
- Education: Wheelwright Grammar School for Boys
- Alma mater: University of Cambridge (BA); University of Manchester (PhD)
- Known for: Williams–Kilburn tube; Manchester Baby; Manchester Mark 1; Atlas computer; MU5
- Spouse: Irene Marsden (m. 1943)
- Children: 2
- Awards: Mountbatten Medal (1997); Royal Medal (1978)
- Scientific career
- Institutions: University of Manchester; Telecommunications Research Establishment
- Thesis: A storage system for use with binary digital computing machines (1948)
- Doctoral advisor: Frederic Calland Williams

Tom Kilburn CBE FRS (11 August 1921 – 17 January 2001) was an English mathematician and computer scientist. Over his 30-year career, he was involved in the development of five computers of great historical significance. With Freddie Williams he worked on the Williams–Kilburn tube and the world's first electronic stored-program computer, the Manchester Baby, while working at the University of Manchester. His work propelled Manchester and Britain into the forefront of the emerging field of computer science.

A graduate of the University of Cambridge, Kilburn worked on radar at the Telecommunications Research Establishment (TRE) in Malvern supervised by Frederic Calland Williams during the Second World War. After the war ended, he was recruited by Williams to work on the development of computers at the University of Manchester. He led the development of a succession of innovative Manchester computers that incorporated a host of ground-breaking innovations and developments, including the Ferranti Mark 1, the world's first commercial computer, and the Atlas, one of the first time-sharing multiprocessing computers that incorporated job scheduling, spooling, interrupts, instruction pipelining and paging.

== Early life and education ==
Tom Kilburn was born in Earlseaton near Dewsbury, Yorkshire, on 11 August 1921, the only son of John William Kilburn, a wool mill clerk who later became a company secretary, and his wife, Ivy Mortimer. From 1932 to 1940, he attended the Wheelwright Grammar School for Boys, where the headmaster encouraged his aptitude for mathematics. He also played sports, notably running.

In 1940, Kilburn started studying mathematics at the University of Cambridge as a student at Sidney Sussex College, Cambridge, funded by a state scholarship, a county major scholarship, and a minor open scholarship. Although many university dons were absent performing war work at places like Bletchley Park, the University of Cambridge maintained an active mathematical community, and Kilburn became the Sidney Sussex College representative in the New Pythagoreans, a clique with the Cambridge University Mathematical Society whose members included Gordon Welchman and Geoff Tootill. Due to the outbreak of the Second World War, courses were compressed to two years, and he graduated in 1942 with First Class Honours in Part I of the Mathematical Tripos and preliminary examinations for Part II.

== Career and research ==
On graduation, Kilburn was recruited by C. P. Snow. He was given a quick course in electronics, and was posted to the Telecommunications Research Establishment (TRE) in Malvern, where he worked on radar in Group 19 under Frederic Calland Williams. The group was responsible for designing and debugging electronic circuitry. Although Williams was initially disappointed at being given someone with so little practical experience, Kilburn became a valued member of the team. On 14 August 1943, he married Irene Marsden, a shop assistant. They went on to raise a son, John, and a daughter, Anne.

Kilburn's wartime work inspired his enthusiasm for some form of electronic computer. The principal technical barrier to such a development at that time was the lack of any practical means of storage for data and instructions. In July 1946, Kilburn and Williams collaboratively developed a storage device based on a cathode-ray tube (CRT) called the Williams–Kilburn tube. A patent was filed in 1946. Initially they used it to store a single bit. The CRT image soon faded, so they devised a scheme by which it was read and refreshed continually, effectively making the data storage permanent. By December 1947, they were able to store 2,048 bits on one 6-inch (150 mm) diameter CRT.

In December 1946, Williams took up the Edward Stocks Massey Chair of Electrotechnics at the University of Manchester, and recruited Kilburn on secondment from Malvern. The two developed their storage technology and, in 1948, Kilburn put it to a practical test in constructing the Manchester Baby, which became the first stored-program computer to run a program, on 21 June 1948. He received the degree of PhD in 1948 for his work at Manchester, writing his thesis on A storage system for use with binary digital computing machines under Williams's supervision.

=== Manchester computers ===
Kilburn anticipated a return to Malvern but Williams persuaded him to stay to work on the university's collaborative project developing the Ferranti Mark 1, the world's first commercial computer. Max Newman withdrew from the project, believing that the development of computers required engineers and not mathematicians at this point, but Williams preferred to return to electrotechnics, leaving Kilburn in charge. He was assisted by Alan Turing, who arrived at Manchester in 1948. The Mark I incorporated innovations such as index registers, and combined CRTs with magnetic drum storage. Nine Mark I computers were sold by between 1951 and 1957.

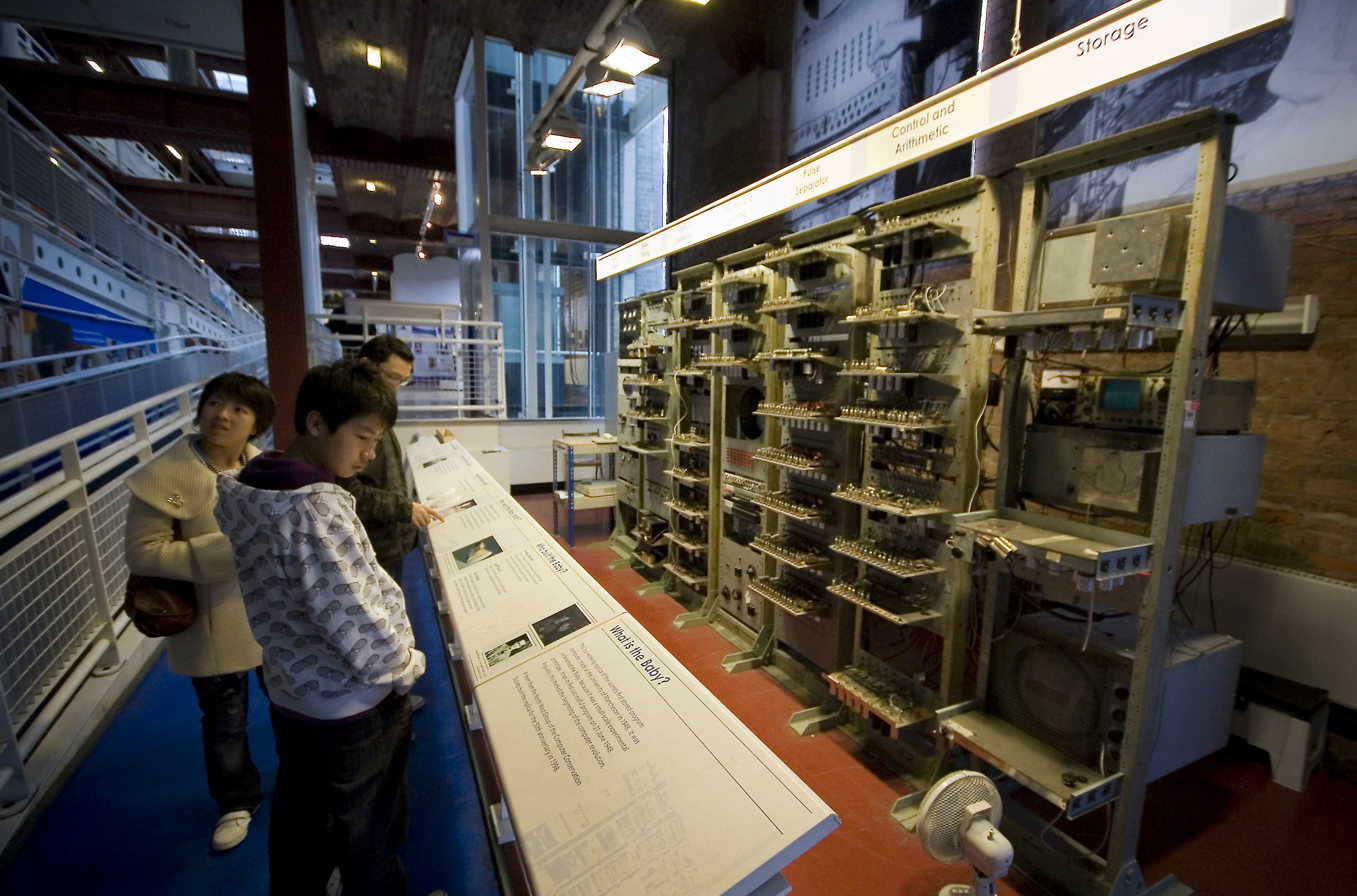
Replica of the Baby at the Museum of Science and Industry in Manchester

Over the next three decades, Kilburn led the development of a succession of innovative Manchester computers. The first, commenced in 1951, was a development of the Mark I known as the megacycle machine or Meg, that replaced the vacuum tube diodes with solid state ones. This permitted an order of magnitude increase in the clock rate. To add further speed, Kilburn provided for 10-bit parallel CRT memory. It was also one of the first computers, if not the first, to have floating point arithmetic. Meg operated for the first time in 1954, and nineteen were sold by Ferranti under the name 'Mercury', six of them to customers overseas.

While Kilburn led one design team working on Meg, he led another with Dick Grimsdale and Douglas Webb, on a research project examining what he believed would be the next step forward in computer design: the use of transistors. The 48-bit machine they completed in November 1953 was the world's first transistor computer, with 550 diodes and 92 transistors, and was manufactured by STC. An improved version completed in April 1955 had 1,300 diodes and 200 transistors, and was sold by Metropolitan-Vickers as the Metrovick 950.

Kilburn's next project, known as Atlas, aimed to create a fast computer by making maximum use of existing and new technologies. The project was backed by Ferranti and a £300,000 grant from the National Research Development Corporation. It incorporated numerous technologies and techniques such as "multiprogramming, job scheduling, spooling, interrupts, pipelining, interleaved storage, autonomous transfer units, virtual storage and paging – though none of these techniques had been invented when the project started in 1956." Other innovations included read-only memory and a compiler-compiler. The greatest innovation was virtual memory, which allowed the drum storage to be treated as if it were core. Three of them were built, and installed at Manchester University, the University of London and the Rutherford Laboratory.

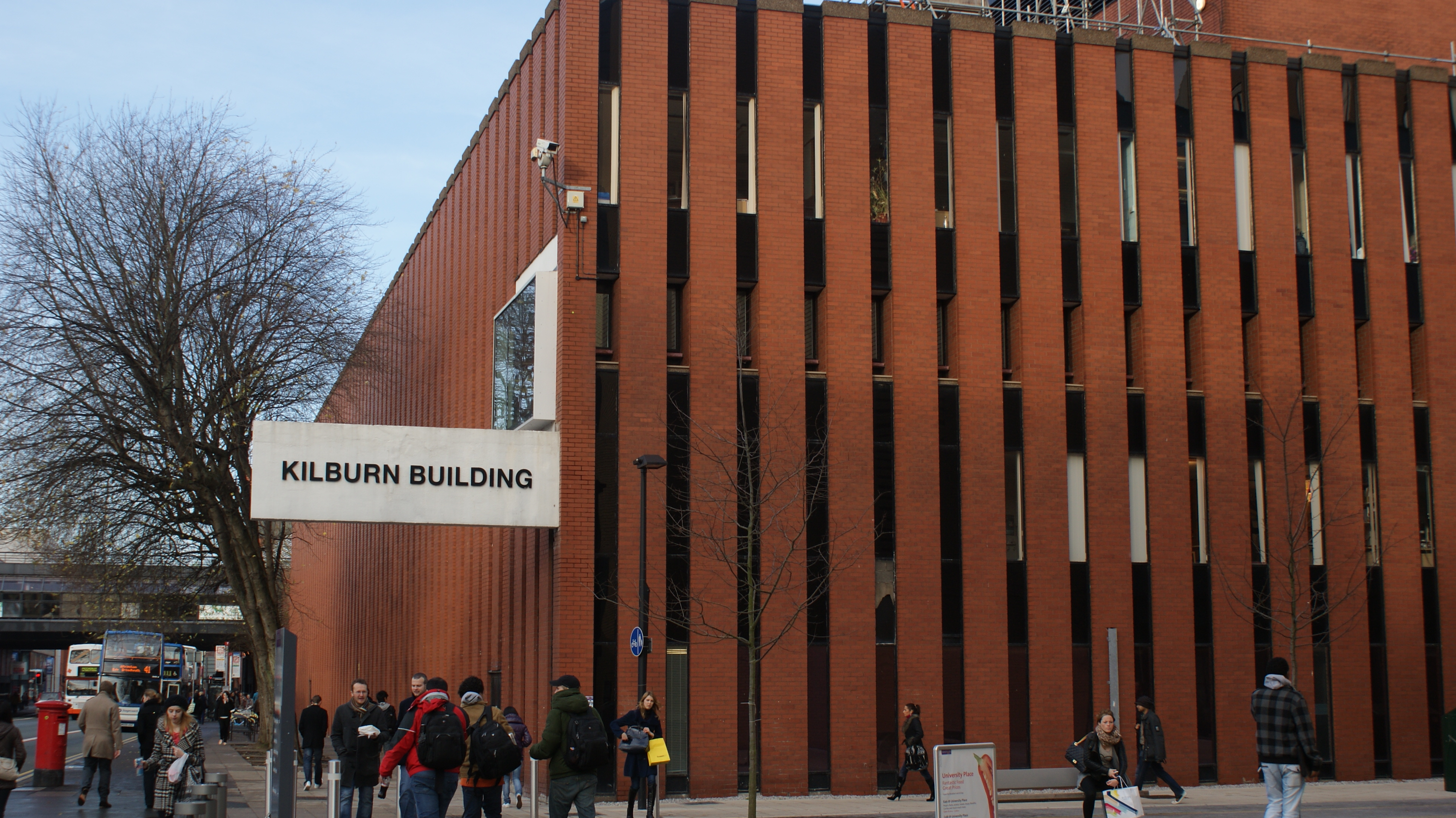
The Kilburn Building, home of the Department of Computer Science at the University of Manchester is named in honour of Tom Kilburn.

Kilburn became a professor of computing engineering in the Department of Electrical Engineering at Manchester in 1960. He was instrumental in forming the Department of Computer Science in 1964, becoming the first head of the department, and served as Dean of the Faculty of Science from 1970 to 1972, and pro-vice-chancellor of the university from 1976 to 1979. His final computer project was the MU5, which was designed to facilitate the running of programs in high-level programming languages. An analysis of code written for the Atlas gave an insight into the frequency of different operands and control structures. The project was assisted by a £630,000 Science Research Council (SRC) grant awarded over five-years. The design heavily influenced the successful ICL 2900 Series.

=== Awards and honours ===
Over the years, Kilburn received numerous awards and accolades. He was elected a Fellow of the Royal Society (FRS) in 1965, a Distinguished Fellow of the British Computer Society in 1974 and a fellow of the Computer History Museum "for his contributions to early computer design including random access digital storage, virtual memory and multiprogramming" in 2000. He was created a Commander of the Most Excellent Order of the British Empire (CBE) in 1973, and was awarded an honorary doctorate of science from the University of Bath in 1979.

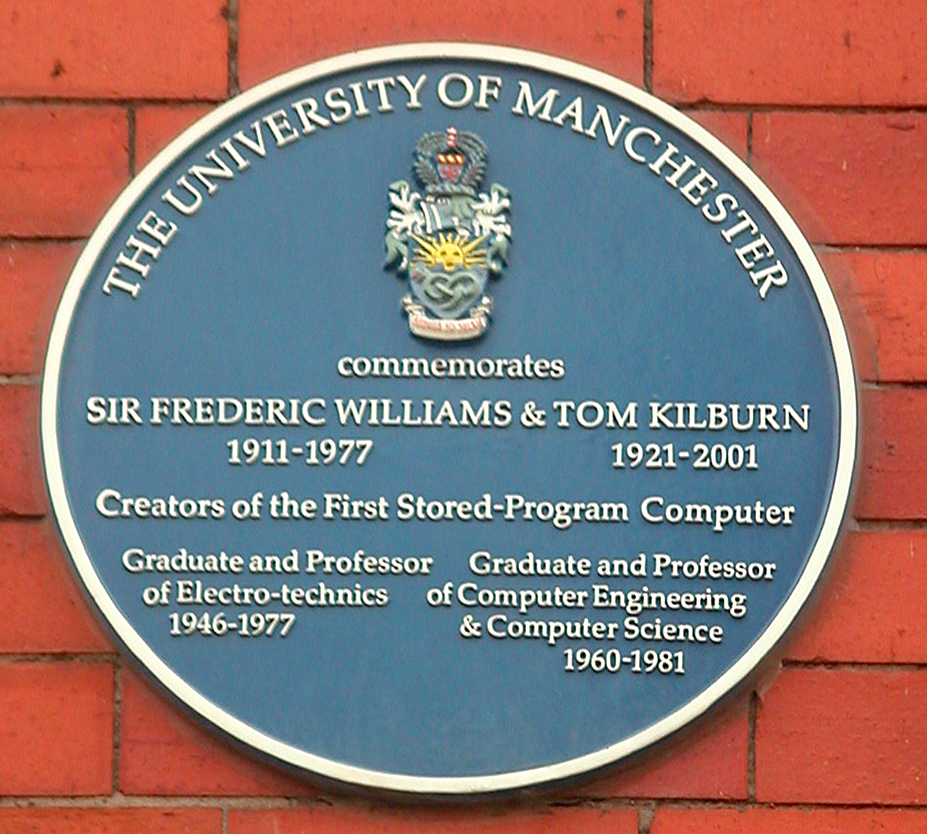
Memorial plaque commemorating Kilburn

Kilburn received the IEEE Computer Society W. Wallace McDowell Award in 1971 "for his achievement in designing and building some of the first – as well as some of the most powerful – computers in the world", the British Computer Society IT Award in 1973, the Royal Medal of the Royal Society, in 1978, the IEEE Computer Society Computer Pioneer Award in 1982, the Eckert-Mauchly Award in 1983, and the Mountbatten Medal. 1997. A building at the University of Manchester, which houses the Department of Computer Science, is named "The Kilburn Building" in his honour. His nomination for the Royal Society reads:

Professor of Computer Engineering in the University of Manchester. He was a pioneer in the engineering realisation of the general purpose electronic digital computer and has made major contributions to the rapid rate of development that has occurred in this field over the past 15 years. His contributions cover the whole range from overall system design to the invention of high speed circuits to meet particular needs. His latest machine, 'Atlas' may well be the most advanced machine currently under construction anywhere in the World.

== Personal life ==
Kilburn married Irene Marsden in 1943 and had two children, one daughter and one son. Kilburn habitually holidayed with his family in Blackpool but was always back in time for Manchester United F.C.'s first match of the football season. He claimed that watching Manchester United win the 1968 European Cup Final at Wembley stadium was the best day of his life. He took early retirement in 1981 to care for his ailing wife, who was suffering from chronic bronchitis, but she died on 3 August 1981, two weeks before his retirement.

After his wife's death, Kilburn lived alone in the modest house they had shared in Manchester. He did not own a personal computer. In 1998 he unveiled a fully functional replica of the Manchester Baby at the Manchester Museum of Science and Industry. He died at Trafford General Hospital in Davyhulme of pneumonia following abdominal surgery on 17 January 2001.

== See also ==
- List of pioneers in computer science

Academic offices
Preceded by -	Head of the Department of Computer Science, University of Manchester; 1964–1980	Succeeded by Dai Edwards
