= Robert Stevens (scientist) =

British scientist (born 1965)

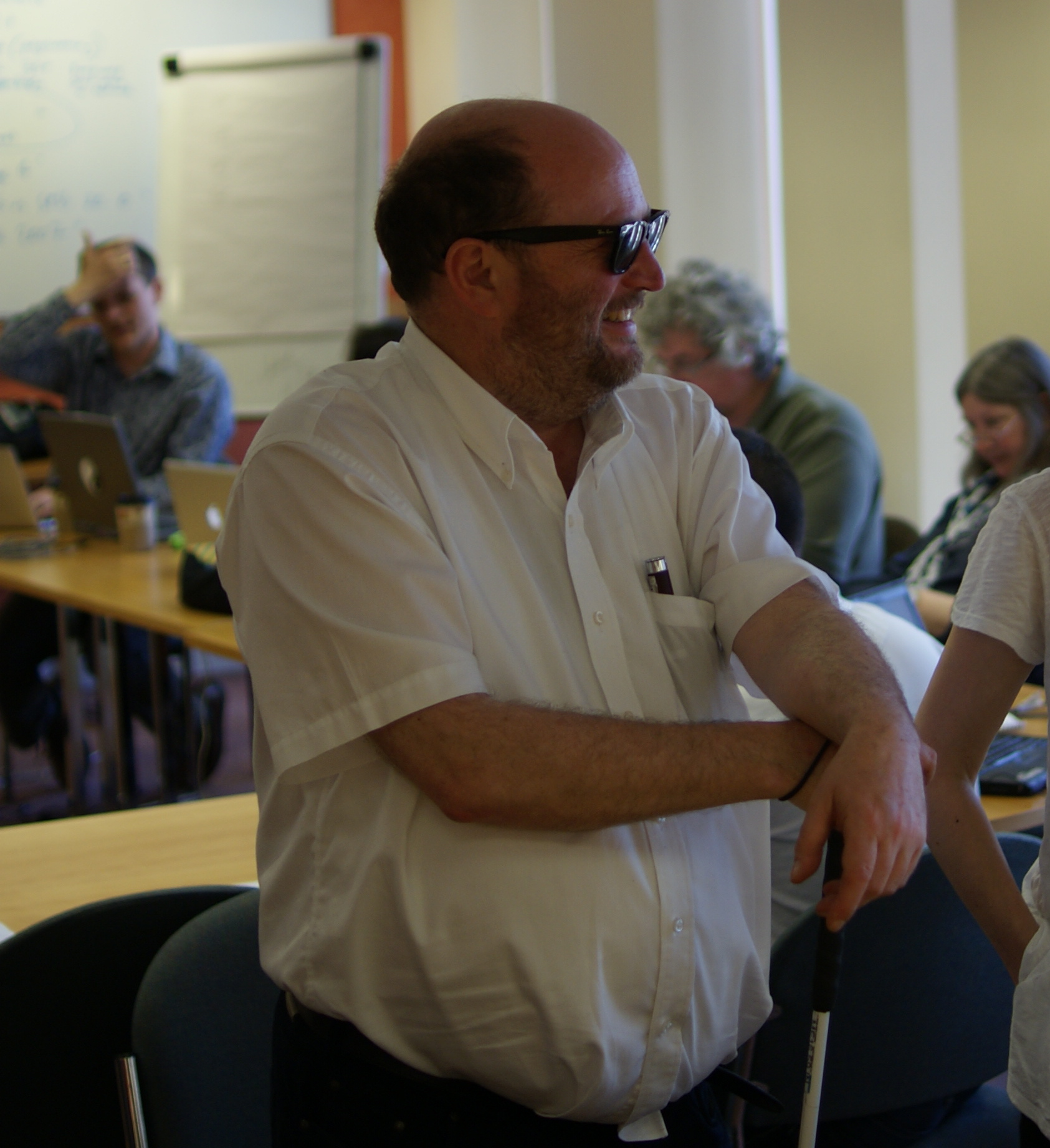
- Robert Stevens
- Born: Robert David Stevens; 11 February 1965 (age 61)
- Education: University of Bristol (BSc); University of York (DPhil)
- Known for: TAMBIS
- Scientific career
- Fields: Bioinformatics; Ontologies; Accessibility; Visual disability
- Workplaces: University of Manchester
- Thesis: Principles for the design of auditory interfaces to present complex information to blind people (1996)
- Doctoral advisor: Alistair Edwards
- Website: www.research.manchester.ac.uk/portal/robert.stevens.html

Robert David Stevens (born 1965) is an emeritus professor of bio-health informatics and former head of the Department of Computer Science at The University of Manchester

== Education ==
Stevens gained his Bachelor of Science degree in biochemistry from the University of Bristol in 1986, a Master of Science degree in biological computation in 1991 and a DPhil in Computer Science in 1996, both from the University of York.

== Career and research ==
Stevens research interests included the construction of biological ontologies, such as the Gene Ontology, and the reconciliation of semantic heterogeneity in bioinformatics. This research has been funded by the Engineering and Physical Sciences Research Council (EPSRC), Biotechnology and Biological Sciences Research Council (BBSRC) and the European Union.

Stevens has been Principal investigator for a range of research projects including Ondex, ComparaGrid, SWAT (Semantic Web Authoring Tool) and the Ontogenesis Network.

Stevens served as Program Chair and co-organiser for the International Conference on Biomedical Ontology (ICBO) 2012 and co-founded the UK Ontology Network. He has also participated in the Health care and Life Sciences Interest Group (HCLSIG) of the World Wide Web Consortium (W3C). Stevens served on the editorial board of the Journal of Biomedical Semantics. Stevens started as a lecturer, then became a senior lecturer, Reader and became a professor in August 2013.

Stevens has taught on several undergraduate and postgraduate courses on software engineering, databases, bioinformatics and runs introductory and advanced courses on the Web Ontology Language. He has been the main doctoral advisor to five successful PhD students and co-supervised several others.

Stevens served as Head of Department of Computer Science at The University of Manchester from 2016 to 2022.

Academic offices
Preceded by Jim Miles	Head of Department of Computer Science, University of Manchester; 2016–2022	Succeeded by Andrew J. Stewart
