= Brian Warboys =

British computer scientist

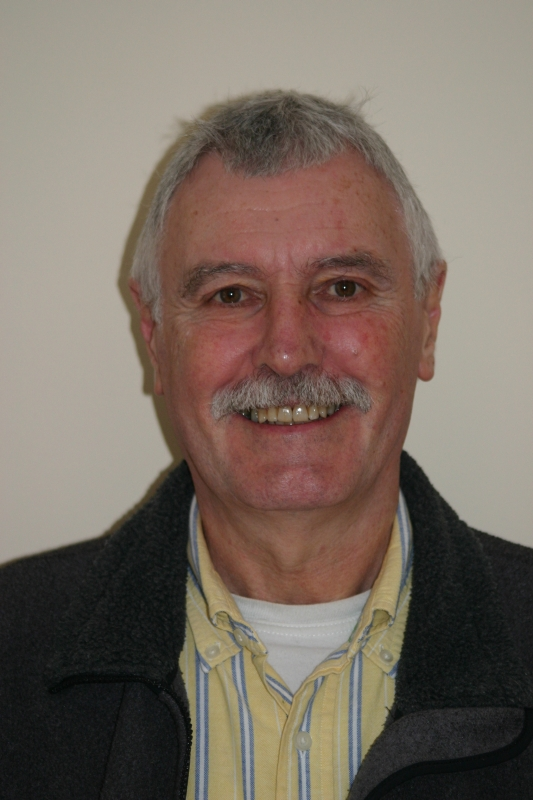
- Born: April 30, 1942 (age 82); England
- Occupation(s): Professor of Software Engineering, University of Manchester (retired)

Brian Warboys (born 30 April 1942), was a British Professor of Software Engineering at the University of Manchester from 1985 until he retired in September 2007. He was subsequently appointed as Professor Emeritus and continues to undertake research. Before joining the university he had worked for ICL, then the UK's largest computer manufacturer. During the 1970s he had been the chief designer of ICL's VME operating system. He is also the author of several non-fiction books.

== ICL VME ==
Warboys worked for ICL from 1963 to 1985. During the 1970s, he was Chief Designer of VME. VME/B was an advanced operating system and was logical and straightforward to use. Amongst IT professionals it was deemed superior to IBM equivalents.

== University of Manchester ==
As Professor of Software Engineering, Warboys researches the development of techniques which enable the dynamic evolution (the ability to change s/w whilst it is executing) of the design of very large systems. He was the founder and principal of the Informatics Process Group (IPG) in the School of Computer Science. IPG was established in 1991 to advance the application of Process Modelling in the context of the organization. Between 1997 and 2002 he led the EPSRC funded Compliant Systems Architecture (CSA) projects. Within Europe he has headed the Manchester operating system team on the ESPRIT-funded EDS project, and the IPG's involvement in the ESPRIT Basic Research Activity PROMOTER on software process modelling and technology. In 2001 he led the IPG's involvement in the Framework IV Basic Research Action PIE, process instance evolution, and later the Archware project. in which he was also joint technical coordinator.

== Recognition ==
He was appointed the first ICL Fellow in 1984.

Academic offices
Preceded by Howard Barringer	Head of the Department of Computer Science, University of Manchester; 1996–2001	Succeeded by Steve Furber
