= SpiNNaker =

Parallel supercomputing architecture

SpiNNaker: spiking neural network architecture
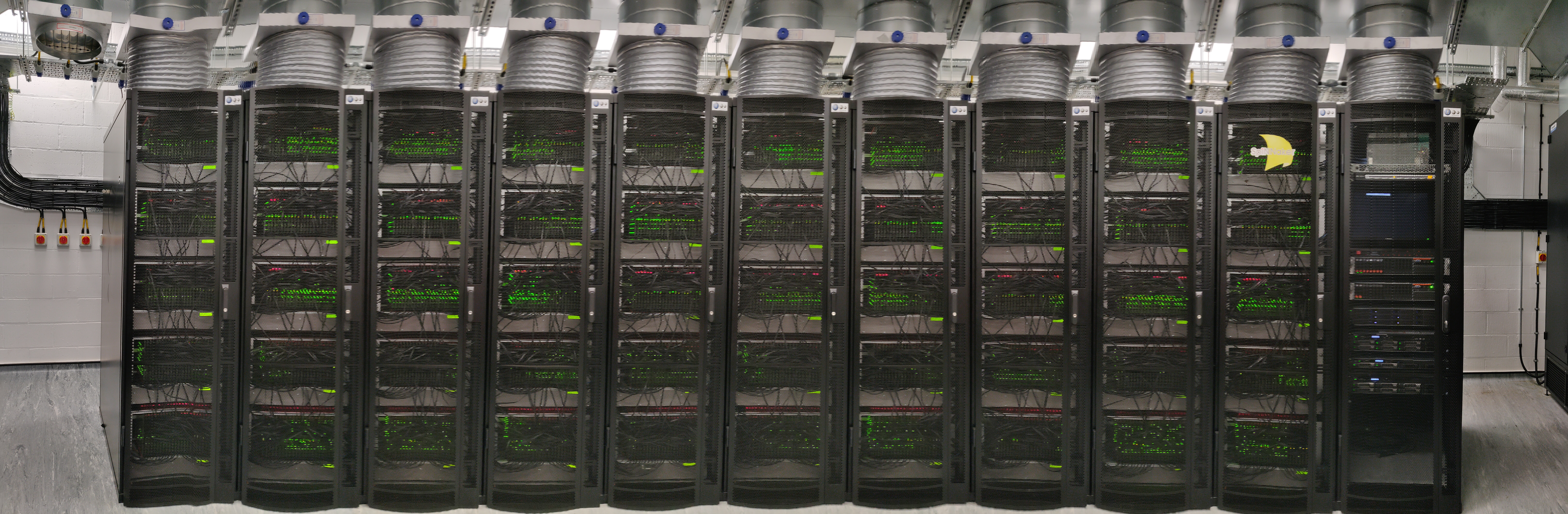
- The SpiNNaker 1 million core machine assembled at the University of Manchester
- Developer: Steve Furber
- Product family: Manchester computers
- Type: Neuromorphic
- Released: 2019
- CPU: ARM968E-S @ 200 MHz
- Memory: 7 TB
- Successor: SpiNNaker 2
- Website: SpiNNaker

SpiNNaker (spiking neural network architecture) is a massively parallel, manycore supercomputer architecture designed by the Advanced Processor Technologies Research Group (APT) at the Department of Computer Science, University of Manchester. It is composed of 57,600 processing nodes, each with 18 ARM9 processors (specifically ARM968) and 128 MB of mobile DDR SDRAM, totalling 1,036,800 cores and over 7 TB of RAM. The computing platform is based on spiking neural networks, useful in simulating the human brain (see Human Brain Project).

The completed design is housed in 10 19-inch racks, with each rack holding over 100,000 cores. The cards holding the chips are held in 5 blade enclosures, and each core emulates 1,000 neurons. In total, the goal is to simulate the behaviour of aggregates of up to a billion neurons in real time. This machine requires about 100 kW from a 240 V supply and an air-conditioned environment.

SpiNNaker is being used as one component of the neuromorphic computing platform for the Human Brain Project.

On 14 October 2018 the HBP announced that the million core milestone had been achieved.

On 24 September 2019 HBP announced that an 8 million euro grant, that will fund construction of the second generation machine, (called SpiNNcloud) has been given to TU Dresden. The new SpiNNcloud supercomputer then went into operation in 2025.
