= Allan M. Ramsay =

British linguist (1953-)

Allan Ramsay
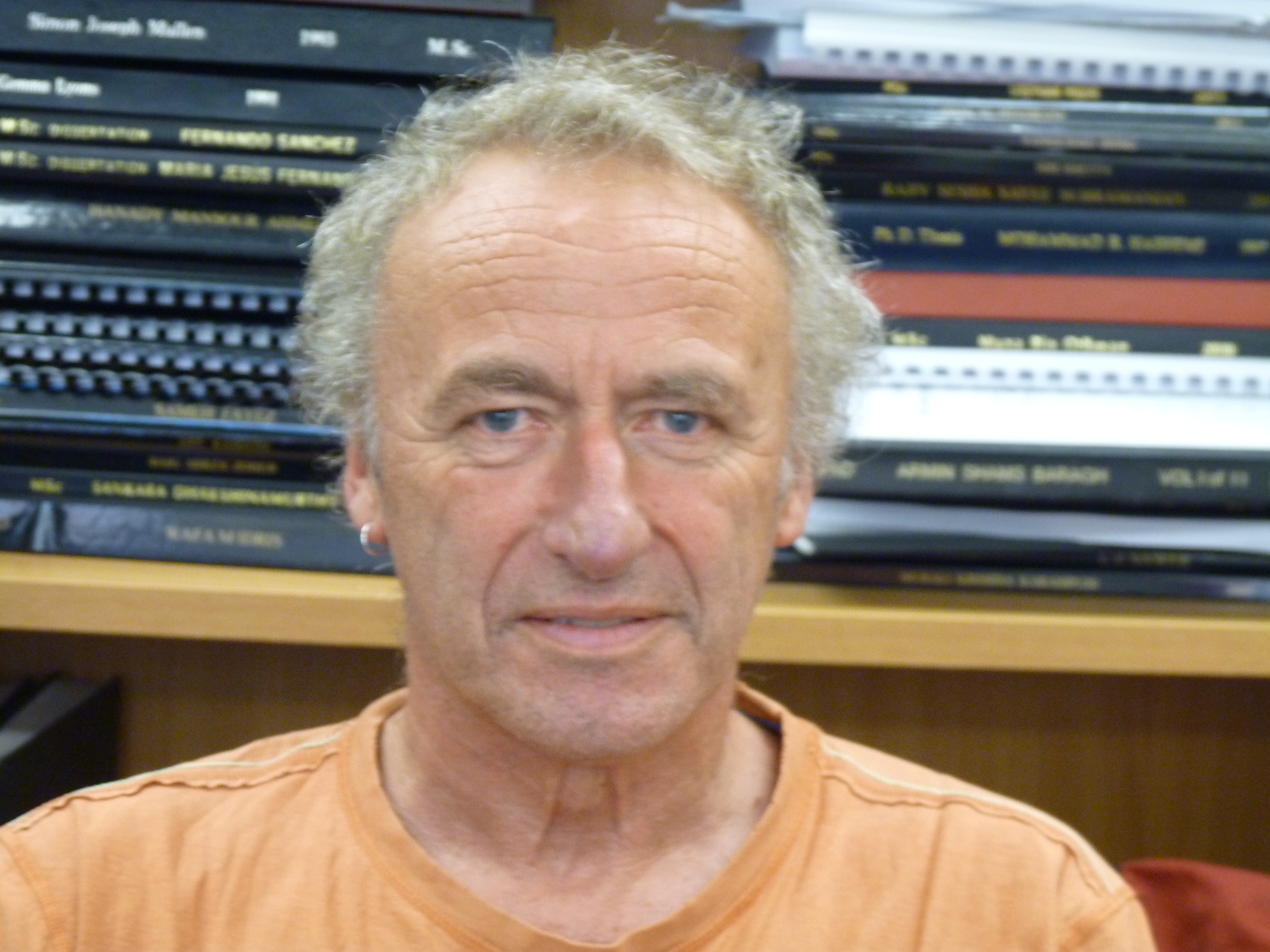
- Born: 1953 (age 72–73)
- Scientific career
- Fields: Syntax; Artificial intelligence; Morphology (linguistics); Natural language processing; Formal semantics (linguistics)
- Institutions: University of Manchester; UMIST; University College Dublin; University of Sussex; University of London
- Thesis: Understanding English descriptions of programs (1980)
- Website: www.cs.man.ac.uk/~ramsay; www.manchester.ac.uk/research/allan.ramsay

Allan M. Ramsay is a Professor of Formal Linguistics in the Department of Computer Science at the University of Manchester.

== Education ==
Ramsay's undergraduate degree was in Logic and Mathematics from the University of Sussex. After completing a Master of Science degree in Logic from the University of London, he returned to Sussex to complete a PhD in Artificial Intelligence. Prior to working at UMIST and the University of Manchester, he was Professor of Artificial Intelligence at University College Dublin.

== Research ==
Ramsay's research focuses on Natural language processing, including morphology and syntax. He has published papers on the analysis of free word order languages, particularly morphology of the Arabic language, which poses a number of specific problems. Some of this research has been funded by the EPSRC.
