= Manchester Centre for Mesoscience and Nanotechnology =

English research centre

The Manchester Centre for Mesoscience and Nanotechnology is a centre for interdisciplinary research in mesoscience and nanotechnology headed by Andre Geim at the University of Manchester. The purpose of the centre is to allow researchers to construct devices from a few micrometres down to 10 nanometres in size. It was opened by Lord Sainsbury on 7 April 2003.

The centre is based in the Department of Computer Science, and houses a suite of Class 100 to Class 1000 cleanrooms. These facilities played an important role in the discovery of Graphene by scientists in Manchester and subsequent Nobel Prize in Physics in 2010. The facility also hosts The North West Nanoscience Doctoral Training Centre (NOWNano DTC) funded by the Engineering and Physical Sciences Research Council in collaboration with Lancaster University.
