= Andy Brass =

British academic

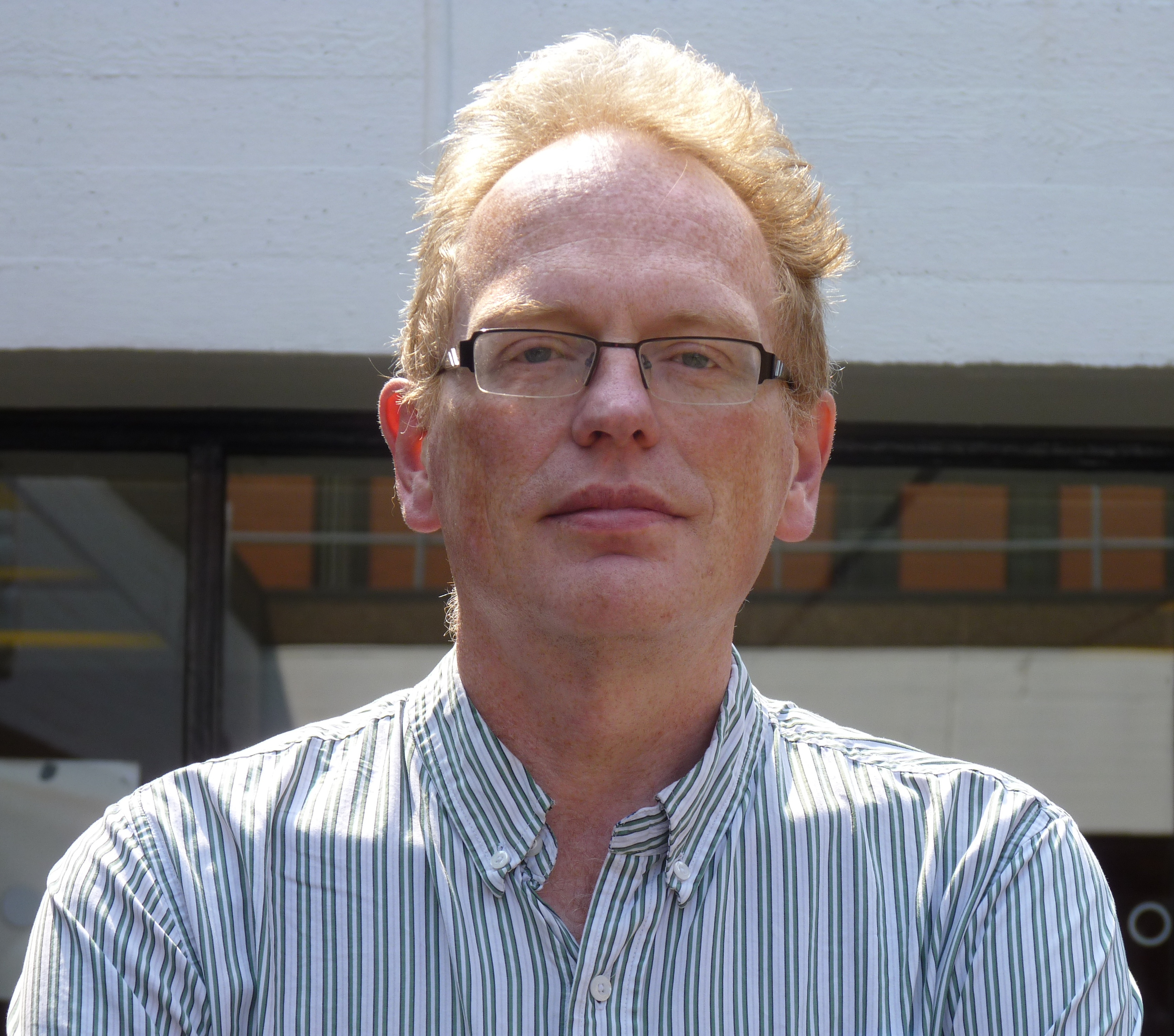
- Born: Andrew M. Brass; United Kingdom
- Education: University of Edinburgh
- Scientific career
- Fields: Bioinformatics
- Workplaces: University of Edinburgh; McMaster University; University of Manchester; Stannington Brass Band; Department of Computer Science; Faculty of Life Sciences
- Thesis: Molecular dynamics simulations of fluorite structure crystals (1987)
- Website: manchester.ac.uk/research/andy.brass

Andrew M. Brass is a professor of bioinformatics at the University of Manchester in the Department of Computer Science and Faculty of Life Sciences.

== Education ==
Brass was educated at the University of Edinburgh, receiving his PhD on Solid-state physics in 1987.

== Research ==
Following his PhD, Brass worked at McMaster University in Canada on a NATO fellowship to study aspects of high-temperature superconductivity and strongly coupled electron systems. In 1990 he moved to the University of Manchester to become a founding member of the bioinformatics group, where he has a wide range of projects in protein function prediction, gene expression analysis, intelligent integration, automated curation, and bioinformatics education.
