= ARM System-on-Chip Architecture =

Book by Steve Furber

- 2nd edition cover
- Author: Steve Furber
- Language: English
- Publication date: 2000 (2nd ed.)
- Publication place: United Kingdom
- Media type: Print
- ISBN: 0201675196
- OCLC: 44267964

ARM System-on-Chip Architecture is a book detailing the system on a chip ARM architecture, as a specific implementation of reduced instruction set computing. It was written by Steve Furber, who co-designed the ARM processor with Sophie Wilson.

The book's content covers the architecture, assembly language programming, support mechanisms for high-level programming languages, the instruction set and the building of operating systems. The Thumb instruction set is also covered in detail.

It has been cited in numerous academic papers, and has been recommended to those working in the development of embedded systems.
