= Kilburn Building =

University building in Manchester, England

The Kilburn Building
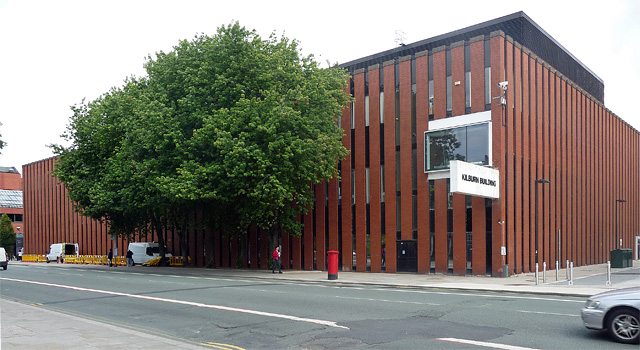
- The Kilburn Building seen from the Oxford Road in 2011
- Interactive map of the The Kilburn Building area
- Former names: Computer Building

General information
- Location: 53.4639°N 2.2308°W
- Construction started: 1969
- Completed: 1972
- Cost: £1.5 million
- Owner: University of Manchester

Technical details
- Size: 76 by 76 metres square

Design and construction
- Architect: Building Design Partnership

Website
- www.cs.manchester.ac.uk/about/maps-and-travel/

The Kilburn Building is a building on Oxford Road in Manchester which is home to the Department of Computer Science at the University of Manchester. The building was designed by the Building Design Partnership and completed in 1972, with three storeys in a square shape, measuring 76 by 76 metres. The building was formerly known as the Computer Building changing its name in 2001 in honour of Tom Kilburn who died in the same year.

== Architecture and history ==
The Pevsner Architectural Guide describes the Kilburn building as a "big aggressive box of brick pier and vertical window strips" which has also been likened in appearance to a giant brick central processing unit (CPU) or graphics processing unit (GPU) heat sink. The second floor features an Auguste Perret style paved piazza which initially featured a fibreglass structure known as the floating point zero.

Up until its demolition in 2015, a pedestrian bridge connected the Kilburn Building to the Alliance Manchester Business School (AMBS), via the Precinct Centre on North Side of the building over the Oxford Road. To the South, the building was connected by another pedestrian walkway (referred to as a dismal corridor in Pevsner) to the Mathematics Tower, Manchester which was demolished in 2005.

The pedestrian walkways initially formed part of a futuristic but ultimately unsuccessful vision of streets in the sky to link Manchester Oxford Road railway station and out to the Hulme Crescents in Hulme and also to Ardwick.

The building was extended on the east side by the information technology (IT) building which was officially opened by Anne Mountbatten-Windsor in 1988.

Some of the first computers housed in the building were the CDC 7600 and the 1906AICT 1900 series from International Computers Limited (ICL).

The cornbrook, a culverted river which drains the urban area South of the River Medlock, flows under the Kilburn building on its way from Gorton to the Manchester Ship Canal at the Pomona Docks.

== Gallery ==
Images of the Kilburn building can be seen in the gallery below:

Depictions of the Kilburn Building
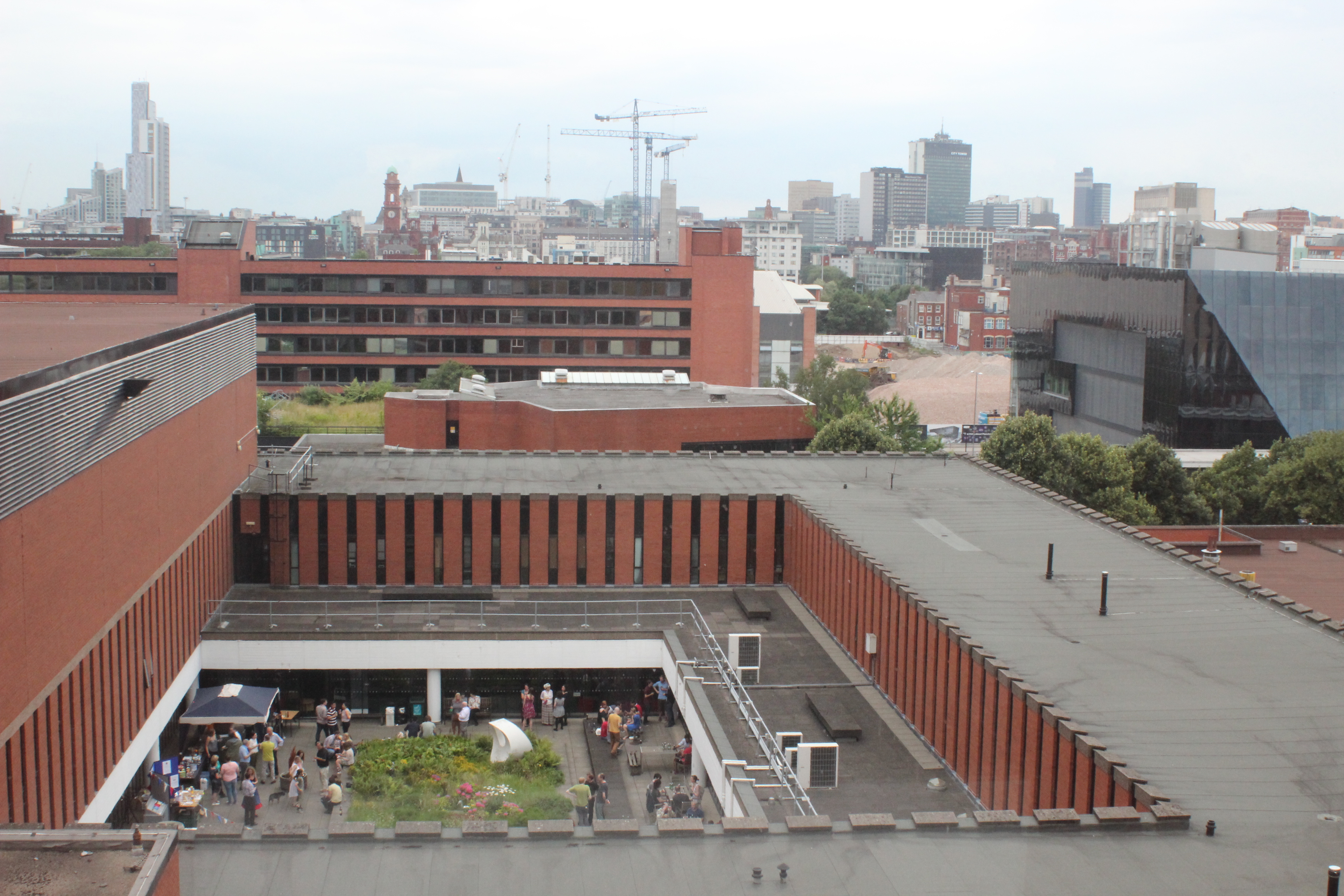
Looking North over the Kilburn Building towards the City from University Place, with Manchester One and

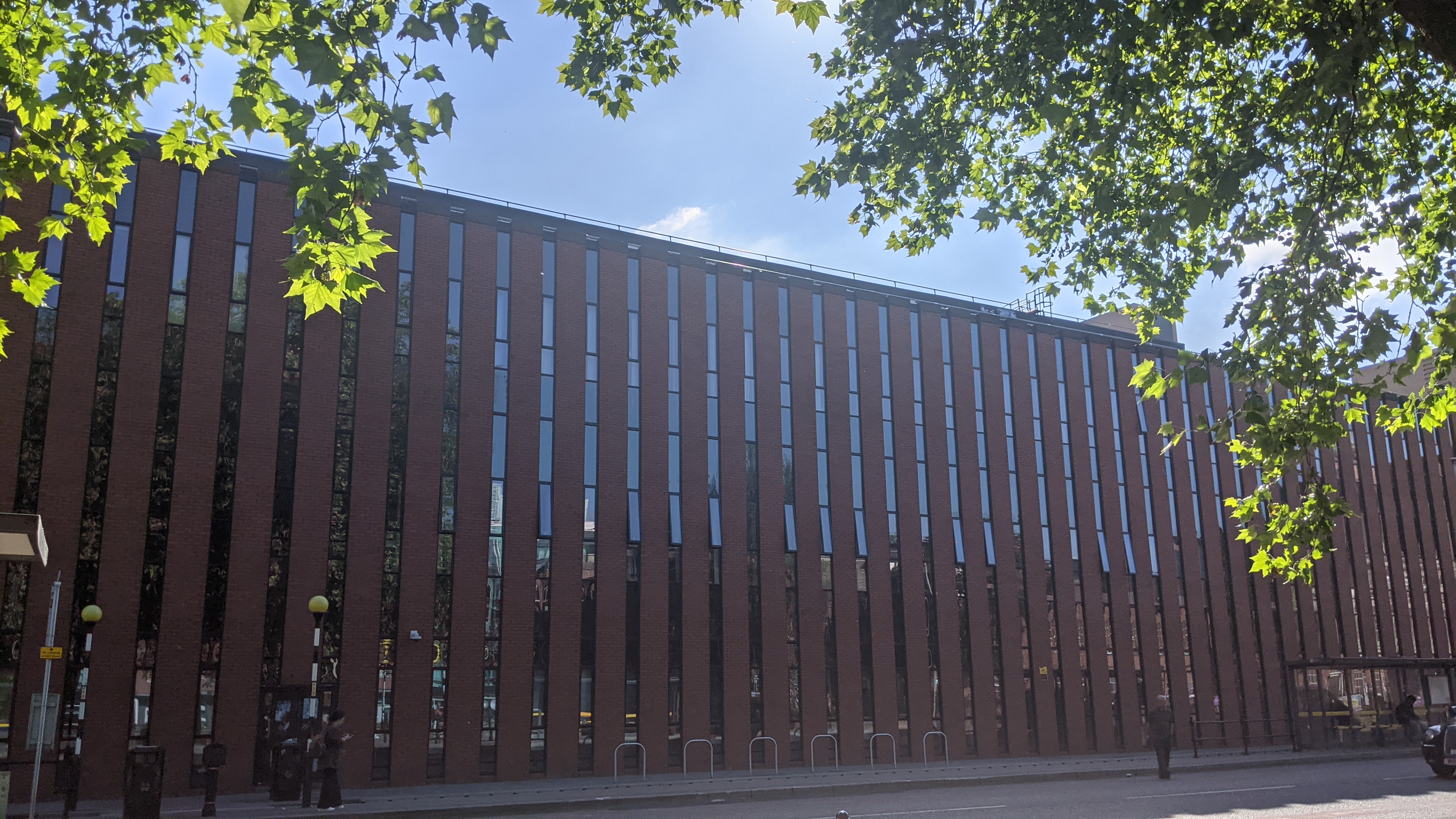
Picture showing "big aggressive box of brick pier and vertical window strips"

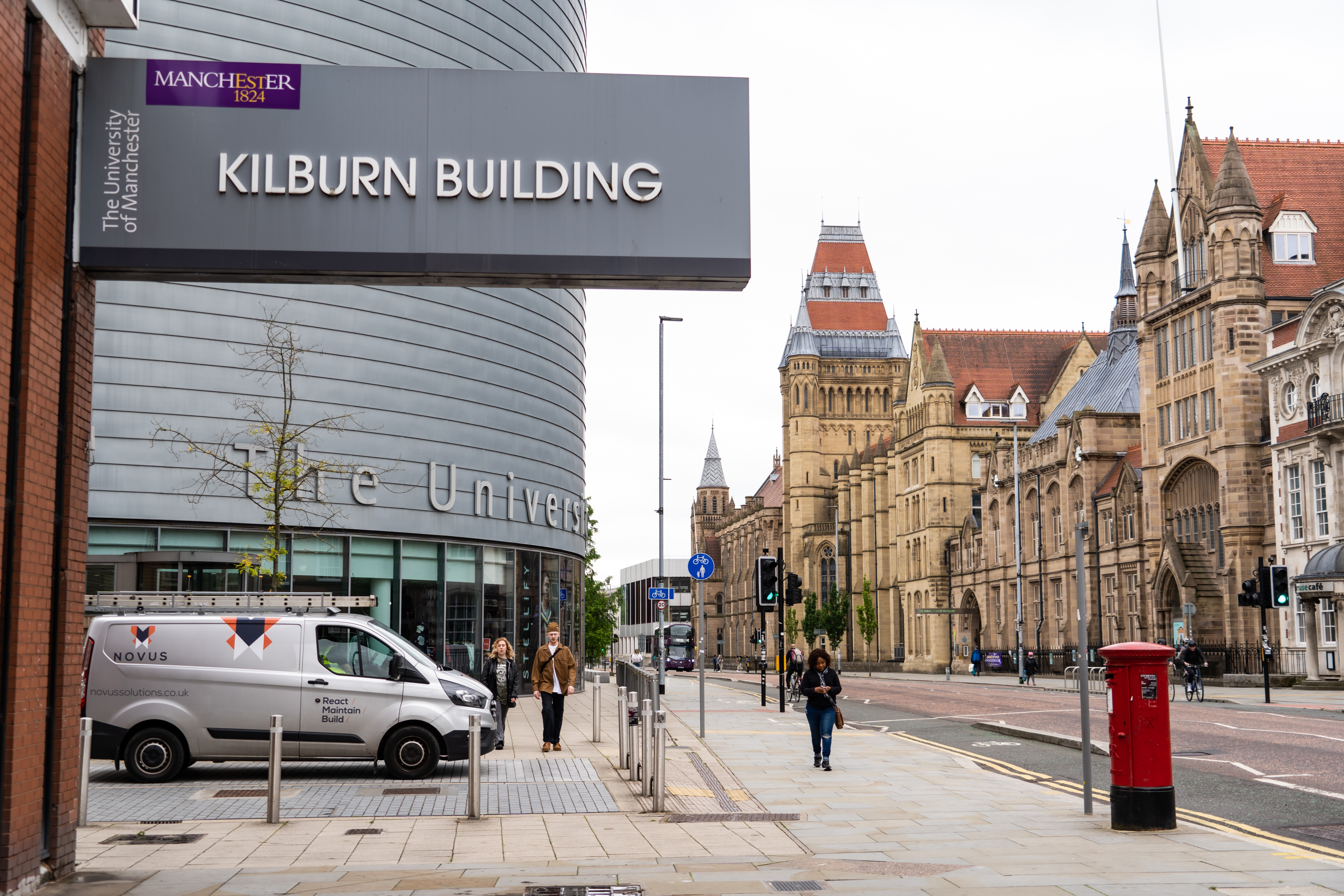
Looking South down the Oxford Road past University place and the Kilburn building sign

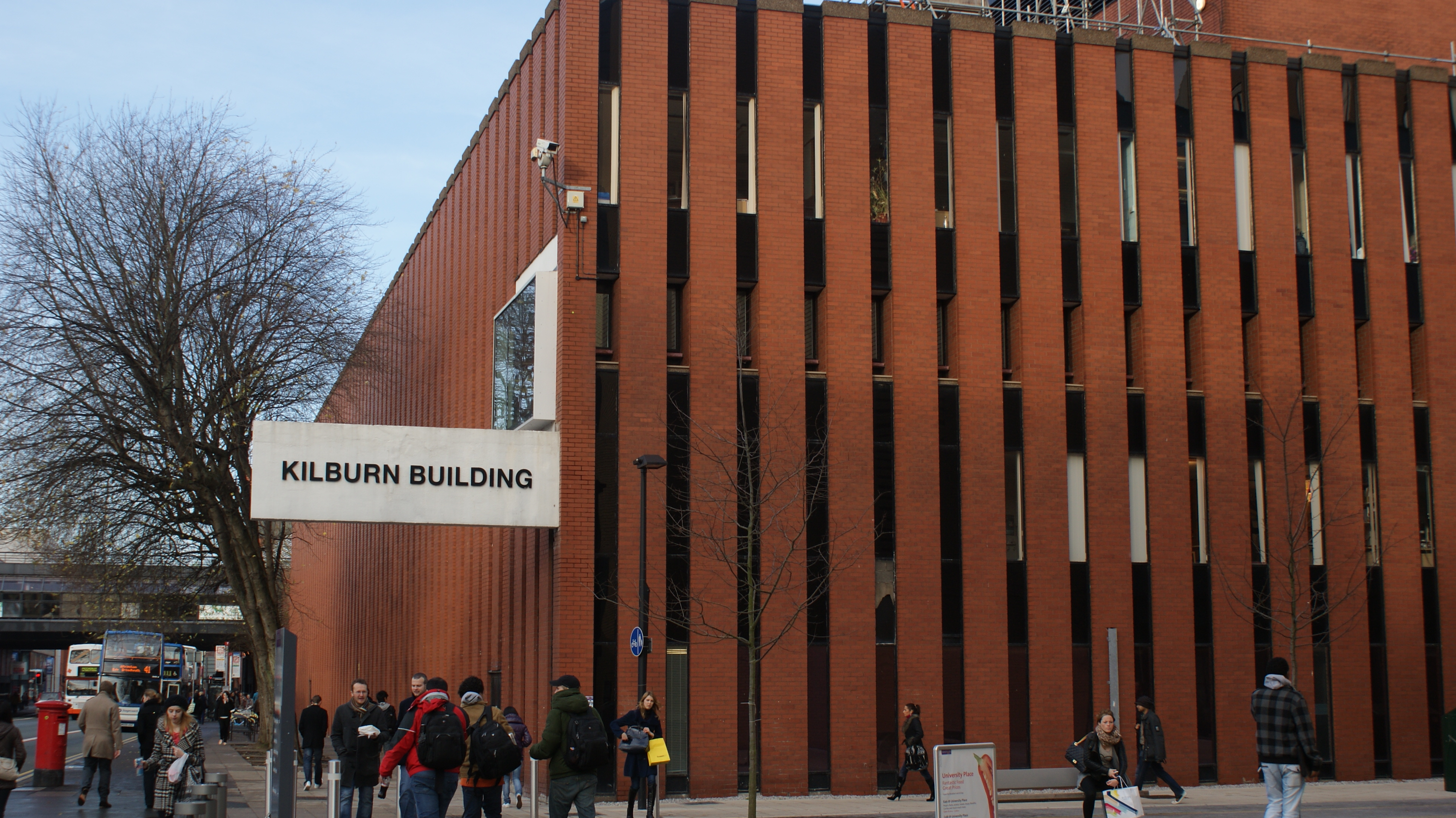
The Kilburn Building in 2009

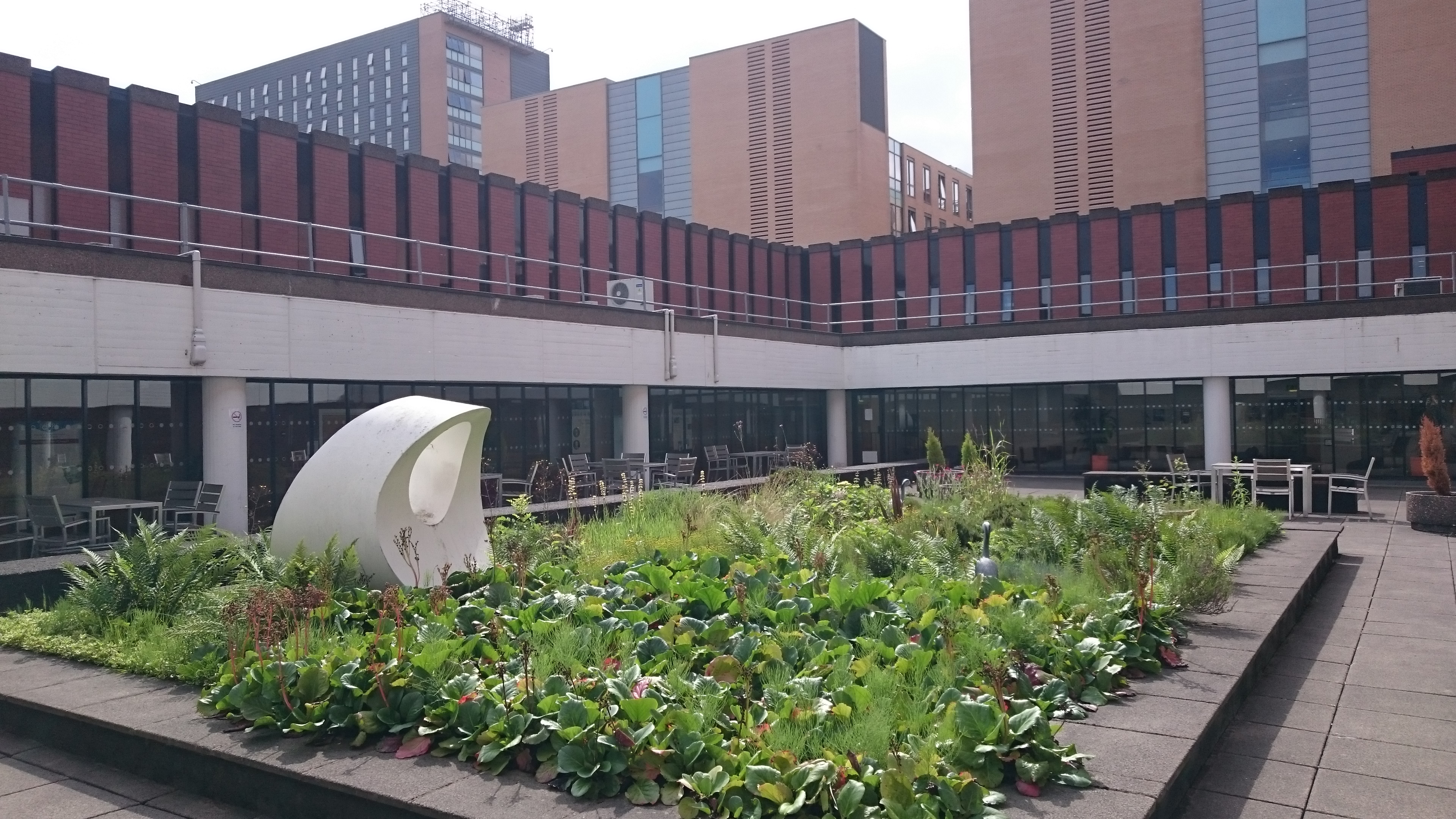
The Auguste Perret style paved piazza at the centre of the building, pictured in 2016 with white floating point sculpture features

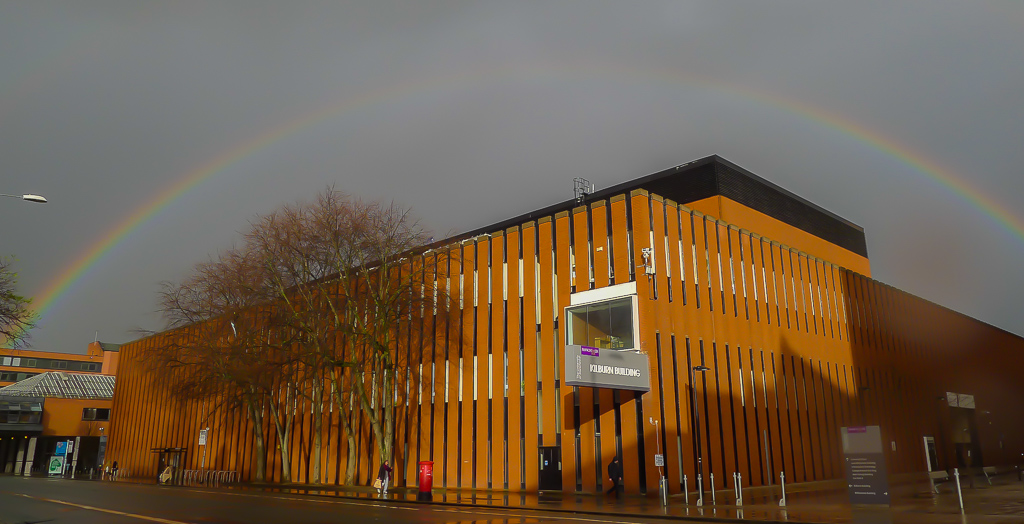
A rainbow over the Kilburn Building in 2014, picture by Toby Howard

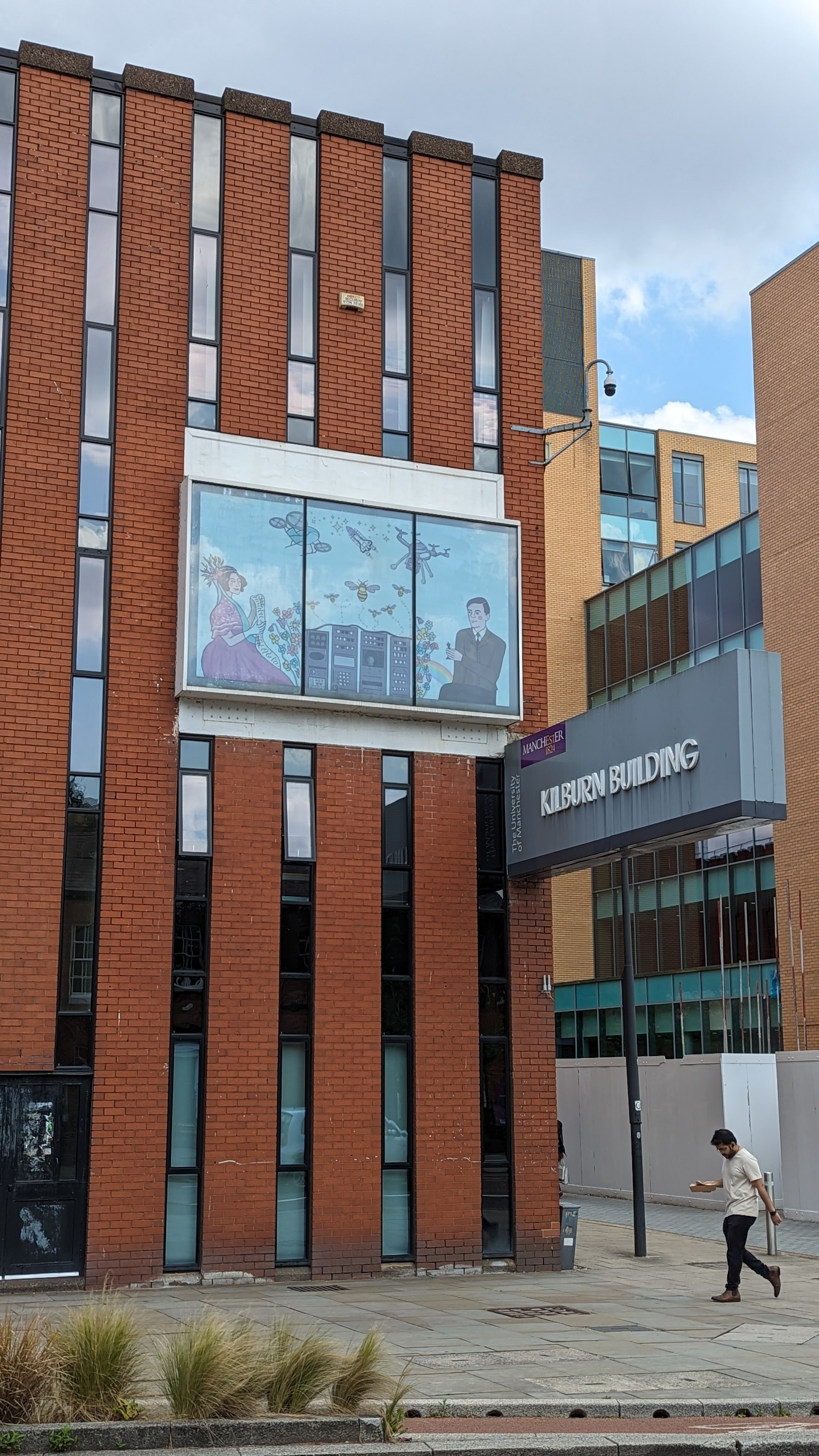
Kilburn building window art depicting Ada Lovelace, the Manchester Baby and Alan Turing
