= Dai Edwards (engineer) =

Welsh computer engineer (1928–2020)

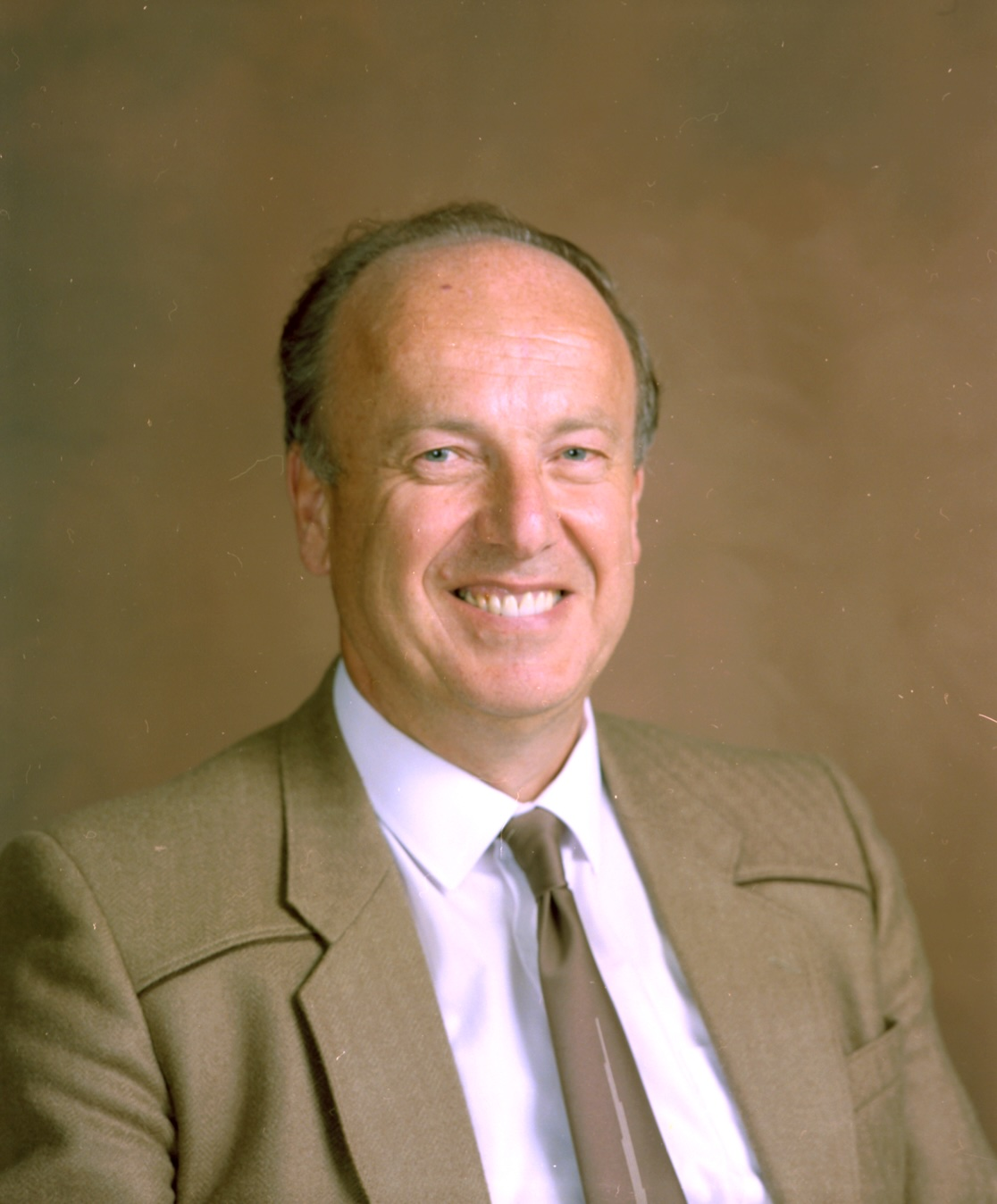
- Dai Edwards circa 1999
- Born: David Beverley George Edwards; 14 March 1928; Tonteg, South Wales
- Died: 11 November 2020 (aged 92)
- Education: University of Manchester (BSc, MSc, PhD)
- Known for: Manchester Baby; Manchester Mark 1; Atlas computer; Virtual memory; MU5
- Scientific career
- Workplaces: University of Manchester
- Thesis: The Design and Construction of an Experimental High Speed Digital Computer (1954)
- Doctoral advisor: Frederic C. Williams

David "Dai" Beverley George Edwards (14 March 1928 – 11 November 2020) was a Welsh computer engineer. He is notable for his pioneering work on the series of digital computers developed at the University of Manchester from the 1940s to the 1980s, and as co-inventor of virtual memory.

== Early life ==
Edwards was born in Tonteg, South Wales, the only child of Cecilia (née George) and William Edwards.

== Career and research ==
In 1945 Edwards enrolled at the University of Manchester to read physics. After graduating in 1948 he became a research student working for Frederic C. Williams in the Department of Electro-Technics on the Small-Scale Electronic Machine (SSEM) computer, also known as "The Baby", the world's first stored-program digital computer.

Edwards subsequently worked on the Manchester Mark 1 computer, improving the cathode-ray tube (CRT) memory, extending the machine's instruction set, and implementing programmable data transfers between the magnetic storage drum and the CRT.

Edwards was awarded a Master of Science degree in 1949, was appointed Lecturer in 1950 and gained his PhD in 1954. for his work on the "Megacycle Machine" (MEG) which was commercialised by Ferranti in 1957 as the Mercury computer. In 1959 he led the engineering team for the MUSE/Atlas computer. This led to his co-invention, with Tom Kilburn, Frank Sumner and M.J. Lanigan, of virtual memory.

In 1964 he joined the University's newly-created Department of Computer Science as Reader, and in 1965 he and Kilburn established the Department's undergraduate programme. He was appointed Professor of Computer Engineering in 1966.

Edwards worked on the design of the experimental MU5 computer (1968–1982), which led to the ICL2900 series, and also worked on MU6 (1982–1987).

Edwards served as Head of the Department of Computer Science (1980–1987), Dean of the Faculty of Science (1982–1983) and retired from the University in 1988.

Edwards' papers are held at the University of Manchester Library.

=== Selected publications ===
- Kilburn, T.; Tootill, G.C.; Edwards, D.G.B.; Pollard, B.W. (1 October 1953). "Digital computers at manchester university". Proceedings of the IEE - Part II: Power Engineering. 100 (77): 487–500. doi:10.1049/pi-2.1953.0145.
- T. Kilburn; D.B.G. Edwards; D. Aspinall (September 1959). "Parallel addition in digital computers: A new fast 'carry' circuit". Proceedings of the IEE - Part B: Radio and Electronic Engineering. 106 (29): 464–466. doi:10.1049/pi-b-2.1959.0316.
- Kilburn, T; Edwards, D.B.G.; Lanigan, M.J.; Sumner, F.H. (1962). "One-Level Storage System"". IRE Transactions on Electronic Computers. 2 (2): 223–235. Bibcode:1962IRTEC..11..223K. doi:10.1109/TEC.1962.5219356.
- Edwards, D.B.G.; Aspinall, D.; Kilburn, T. (1964). "Design principles of the magnetic tape system for the Atlas computer". Radio and Electronic Engineer. 27 (1): 65–73. doi:10.1049/ree.1964.0012.
- Edwards, D.B.G., Lanigan, M.J. and Kinniment, D.J., 1964, September. High-speed ferrite-core storage system. In Proceedings of the Institution of Electrical Engineers (Vol. 111, No. 9, pp. 1501-1510). IEE.
- Edwards, David BG, Alan E. Knowles, and J. V. Woods. "MU6-G. A new design to achieve mainframe performance from a mini-sized computer." In Proceedings of the 7th annual symposium on Computer Architecture, pp. 161-167. 1980.
- Edwards, Dai (Summer 2013), "Designing and Building Atlas", Resurrection: The Bulletin of the Computer Conservation Society, 62: 9–18, ISSN 0958-7403

== Personal life ==
In 1953 Edwards married Betty Duckworth, who died in 1977. In 1979 Edwards married Jane Ellis.

Academic offices
Preceded by Tom Kilburn	Head of the Department of Computer Science, University of Manchester; 1980–1987	Succeeded by John Gurd
