= Distinguished Fellow of the British Computer Society =

Distinguished Fellow of the British Computer Society (DistFBCS)
- Awarded for: "outstanding contribution to the advancement of computing"
- Sponsored by: BCS
- Date: 1969
- Location: London
- Country: United Kingdom
- No. of Fellows: 33 as of 2020
- Website: www.bcs.org/more/awards-and-competitions/distinguished-fellowship-distfbcs/

Distinguished Fellow of the British Computer Society (DFBCS or DistFBCS) is an award and fellowship granted by the British Computer Society for members of the computing profession who have made an outstanding contribution to the advancement of computing.

The Distinguished Fellowship of BCS is awarded under bylaw 7 of the BCS's Royal Charter. Trustee Board Regulation 1.2 specifies that the award may be made even if the individual in question is not already a member of BCS and may not be eligible for any other class of membership.

The award was first approved in 1969 and the first election was made in 1971 to Edsger W. Dijkstra. The nominations committee is responsible for identifying and proposing suitable candidates. The actual election of such members of the profession is made by a resolution of the trustee board on the recommendation of the president.

== Fellowship criteria ==
Any candidate for Distinguished Fellowship should be considered against the following criteria:

- The contribution to computing should be seen in terms of major importance to the overall development of computing, with substantial personal recognition through peer review over a substantial and sustained career. There is no restriction on nomination on the grounds of nationality or of existing membership of BCS and nominations from business, industrial, research or academic backgrounds are equally acceptable and work of either a practical or theoretical nature may be equally valid.
- At any time, both the work and the stature of the individual nominated should be commensurate with the standards set by previous recipients although it is not expected that there will be more than one Distinguished Fellow elected every two years.

To be elected, the nomination must be on the Trustee Board Agenda, and at least 3/4 of those present must resolve in favour.

== Distinguished Fellows ==
Laureates of the award include:

| Name | Elected |
|---|---|
| Edsger W. Dijkstra | 1971 |
| Christopher Strachey | 1971 |
| Grace Hopper | 1973 |
| Maurice Wilkes | 1973 |
| Andrey Ershov | 1974 |
| Tom Kilburn | 1974 |
| James H. Wilkinson | 1974 |
| Isaac L. Auerbach | 1975 |
| Donald W. Davies | 1975 |
| B. V. Bowden, Baron Bowden | 1976 |
| Charles W. Bachman | 1977 |
| C. A. R. Hoare | 1978 |
| Gene Amdahl | 1979 |
| Donald Knuth | 1980 |
| Iann Barron | 1986 |
| Robin Milner | 1988 |
| Wladyslaw M. Turski | 1989 |
| Robb Wilmot | 1990 |
| Fred Brooks | 1994 |
| Bill Gates | 1994 |
| Tim Berners-Lee | 1996 |
| David Deutsch | 1998 |
| Peter T. Kirstein | 2004 |
| Scott McNealy | 2007 |
| Vint Cerf | 2011 |
| Warren East | 2013 |
| Hermann Hauser | 2013 |
| Steve Furber | 2014 |
| Wendy Hall | 2016 |
| Martha Lane Fox | 2016 |
| Simon Peyton Jones | 2017 |
| Eben Upton | 2019 |
| Sophie Wilson | 2020 |
