= Andrew J. Stewart =

Professor of Cognitive Science at The University of Manchester (born 1971)

Andrew Stewart
- Born: Andrew James Stewart; 1971 (age 54–55)
- Education: Methodist College Belfast
- Alma mater: University of Glasgow (BSc, PhD)
- Scientific career
- Fields: Cognitive Science; Open Research; Data Visualisation
- Institutions: University of Manchester; Unilever
- Thesis: The Time Course of the Influence of Implicit Causality Information on Resolving Anaphors (1998)
- Doctoral advisor: Martin Pickering; Tony Sanford
- Website: research.manchester.ac.uk/en/persons/andrew.j.stewart

Andrew James Stewart (born 1971) is a Professor of Cognitive Science and Head of the Department of Computer Science at the University of Manchester.

== Education ==
Stewart was educated at the Methodist College Belfast and the University of Glasgow where he was awarded a joint honours Bachelor of Science degree in cognitive science and computer science 1994. He was introduced to functional programming as an undergraduate by Philip Wadler via the Orwell language and spent a term as an exchange student at University of California, Berkeley where he took courses taught by John Searle. He returned to Glasgow for his PhD in Psychology, awarded in 1998 for research supervised by Martin Pickering and Tony Sanford.

== Career and research ==
Stewart's research interests are in cognitive science, open research and data visualisation.

Stewart is the Open and Reproducible Research Lead at the University of Manchester. and a member of the eScience Lab and the Human Computer Systems Group. He is also a Fellow of the Software Sustainability Institute (SSI).

== Personal life ==
Stewart's mother is the athlete Joan Atkinson who represented Northern Ireland in the Commonwealth Games.

Academic offices
Preceded by Robert Stevens	Head of Department of Computer Science, University of Manchester; 2022–present	Incumbent
