= Chris J. Taylor =

Professor of Medical Biophysics at the University of Manchester

Chris Taylor OBE FREng
- Born: Christopher John Taylor; December 25, 1945 (age 80); Coventry
- Education: Great Yarmouth Grammar School
- Alma mater: University of Manchester (BSc, PhD)
- Known for: Active shape models
- Spouse: Jill Andrea Neal (m. 1968)
- Children: 2
- Scientific career
- Fields: Computer vision; Medical imaging; Medical image computing; Artificial Intelligence
- Workplaces: University of Manchester
- Thesis: General methods of analysing biomedical images (1972)
- Doctoral advisor: P. O. Tates
- Website: research.manchester.ac.uk/en/persons/chris.taylor

Christopher John Taylor (born 25 December 1945) is a British academic who is a professor of Medical Biophysics and Associate Vice President (AVP) for digital strategy and innovation at the University of Manchester. He is jointly appointed by the Faculty of Biology, Medicine and Health (FBMH), in the Faculty of Science and Engineering (FSE), where he served as Head of the Department of Computer Science from 2004 to 2008.

== Education ==
Taylor was educated at Great Yarmouth Grammar School and the University of Manchester where he was awarded a Bachelor of Science (BSc) degree in physics in 1967 and a PhD in 1972 for research supervised by B. R. Pullan and P. O. Tates in the Department of Physics and Astronomy.

== Career and research ==
Taylor's research interests are in computer vision, medical imaging, medical image computing and artificial intelligence.

Taylor is known for his work on active shape models.

=== Awards and honours ===
Taylor was appointed Order of the British Empire (OBE) in 2001 and elected a Fellow of the Royal Academy of Engineering (FREng) in 2006.

== Personal life ==
Taylor married Jill Andrea Neal in 1968 and has two children.

Academic offices
Preceded by Steve Furber	Head of the School of Computer Science, University of Manchester; 2004–2008	Succeeded by Norman Paton
