= Andrei Voronkov =

Andrei Voronkov may refer to:

- Andrei Voronkov (computer scientist) (born 1959), Russian computer scientist
- Andrei Voronkov (volleyball) (born 1967), Russian volleyball coach and former player
- Andrey Varankow (born 1989), Belarusian football forward
