= Toby Howard =

British computer scientist

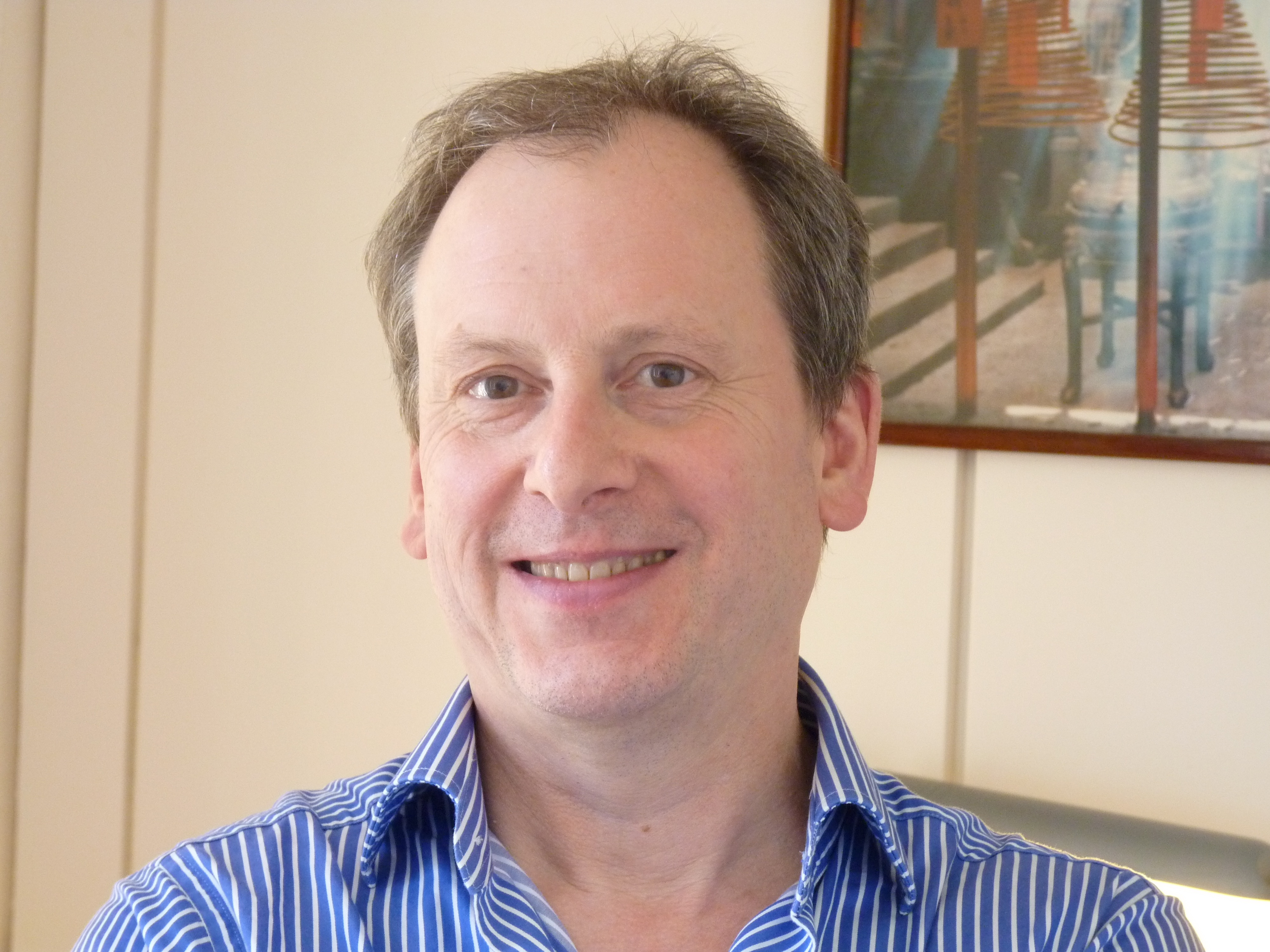
- Education: University of Manchester
- Scientific career
- Fields: Computer graphics; Virtual environments
- Workplaces: University of Manchester
- Doctoral students: Adrian Albin-Clark; Xin Bao; Russell Broughton; Fabrice Caillette; Nicolas Gaborit; Rezwan Sayeed
- Website: www.cs.man.ac.uk/~toby; www.manchester.ac.uk/research/toby.howard

Toby L. J. Howard is an Honorary Reader in the Department of Computer Science at the University of Manchester in the UK. He was appointed Lecturer in 1985, and was Director of Undergraduate Studies in the Department 2011–2019. He retired from the university in 2020 and was appointed to an Honorary position.

== Education ==
Howard was educated at Birkenhead School, and then the University of Manchester receiving a Bachelor of Science degree in computer science and a Master of Science degree in 1983 for work on the graphics facilities of the MU6 network.

== Research ==
Howard's research interests are computer graphics and virtual environments. as a member of the Advanced Interfaces Group (AIG) and has supervised several doctoral students. Howard's research projects have included:

- Virtual reality as a rehabilitative technology for phantom limb experience, investigating using virtual environments for treating phantom limb pain in amputees.
- Augmented reality, with preliminary work on an interactive display for public engagement.
- Virtual environments for psychology research. Telepresence and telepathy in immersive virtual reality; used immersive virtual environments to test for telepathic effects:
- Augmented Reality Image Synthesis (ARIS): augmenting photographs with correctly illuminated objects in real time.
- Virtual environments for crime scene investigation. We worked with Greater Manchester Police on the REVEAL project, investigating reconstructing crime scenes using virtual environments with accurate global illumination.
- VR for large-scale applications" (VRLSA) – concentrated on the development of industrial applications and resulted in the release of MAVERIK VR kernel.

== Teaching ==
Howard led the undergraduate courses COMP27112 Computer Graphics and Image Processing and COMP37111 Advanced Computer Graphics. At Masters level he taught computer graphics and databases.

== Public engagement ==
Howard was active in public engagement, focusing on projects with schools. He founded and led the annual UK Schools Computer Animation Competition which ran 2008–2018.

== Other activities ==
Howard is active in documenting the history of computers developed at the University of Manchester.
