= University Place, Manchester =

Campus building in Manchester, England

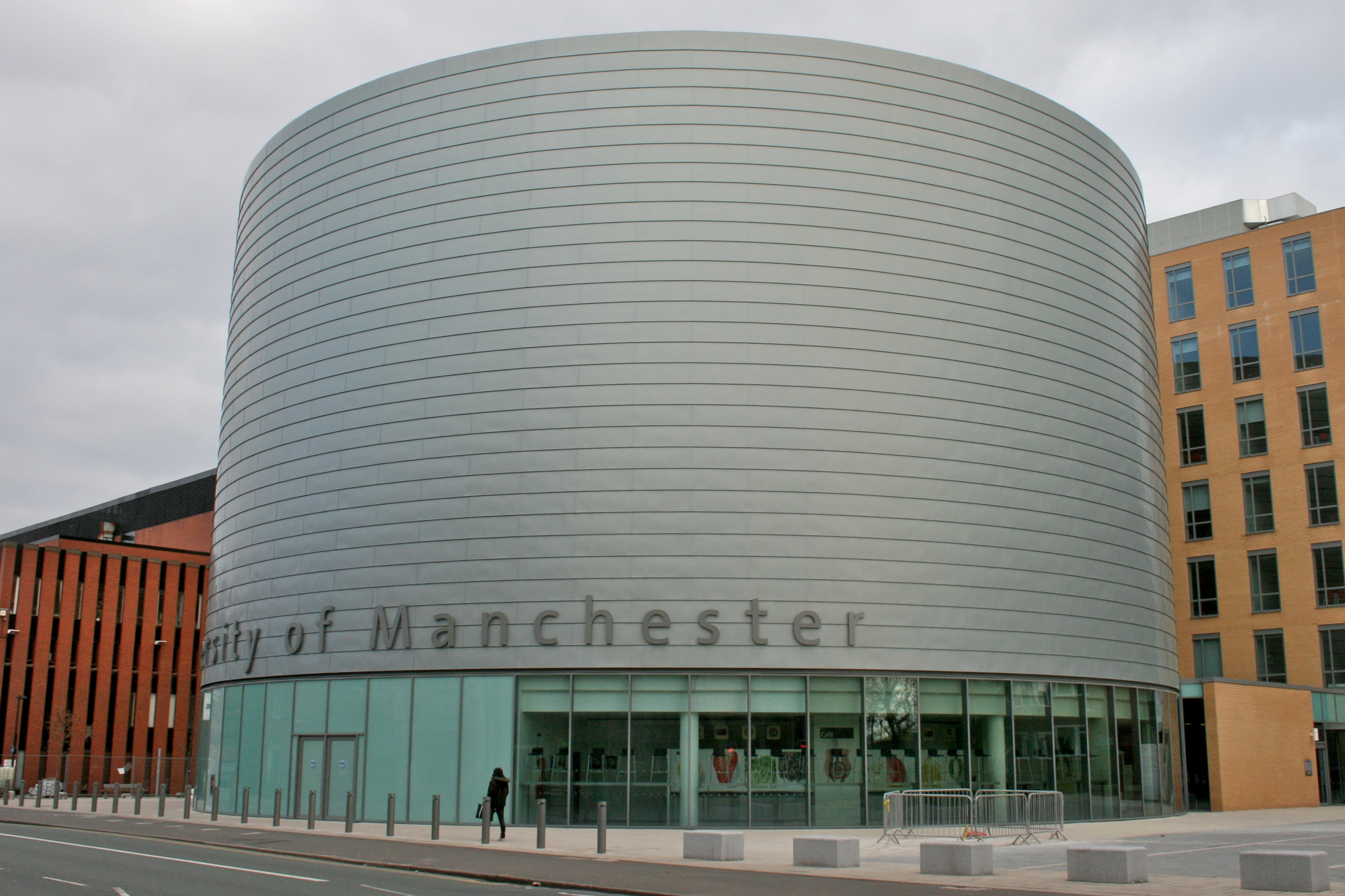
- University Place, Manchester
- Interactive map of the University Place, Manchester area

General information
- Location: 53.466806°N 2.233611°W
- Owner: University of Manchester

Website
- www.conference.manchester.ac.uk/venues/search/details/?property=10

University Place, Manchester is a conference venue at the University of Manchester that contains the largest dedicated lecture theatre in Greater Manchester.

== Location and use ==
Located in the centre of the University of Manchester campus next to the Kilburn Building in Chorlton-on-Medlock, University Place has 43 meeting rooms ranging in size from 18 person to a 600 seater lecture theatre. An additional 850 square metres of ground floor space can be used for exhibitors alongside an internal marquee style area covering 500 square metres. The University of Manchester gift shop and cafe is located on the ground floor. It is used for teaching and hosts large conferences such as the annual British Educational Research Association (BERA) conference in 2024 and 2026.
