= AMULET (processor) =

Microprocessor series developed at the University of Manchester

AMULET is a series of microprocessors implementing the ARM processor architecture. Developed by the Advanced Processor Technologies group at the Department of Computer Science at the University of Manchester (formerly the AMULET and PAL groups based at the same institution), AMULET is unique amongst ARM implementations in being an asynchronous microprocessor, not making use of a square wave clock signal for data synchronization and movement.

== List of AMULET microprocessors ==
- AMULET1 — Designed in 1990 and first fabricated in 1993. Its estimated performance is approximately 70% of that of a comparably-sized synchronous ARM6 running at 20 MHz.
- AMULET2 — A re-implementation of AMULET1 first fabricated in 1996. Features on-chip memory that can be used either as processor cache or mapped RAM. The APT group estimates AMULET2 to have a similar power dissipation/performance ratio as ARM8. One very notable feature due to the asynchronous design is the drop of power dissipation to 3 μW when not in use (assuming the on-board timer, which handles DRAM refresh, is also inactive).
- AMULET3 — This was a redesigned architecture aiming at higher performance than the previous AMULET processors whilst retaining low power dissipation. Fabricated in 2000, it supported the ARM level 4 instruction set compatibility, alongside support for Thumb mode (i.e. ARM9TM). Performance and power dissipation were approximately the same as an ARM9 fabricated on the same technology. AMULET3 was employed in a commercial prototype DECT device because of its inherent low electromagnetic interference characteristics. This did not go into manufacture for non-technical reasons.

== See also ==
- ARM architecture
