= Utopia Documents =

- Developers: Lost Island Labs Ltd., a spin-out from the University of Manchester
- Operating system: Windows XP, Windows Vista, Windows 7 Mac OS X 10.6 and later Debian Linux
- Platform: Desktop computer, Laptop computer
- Size: Windows: 28.2 MB; Mac OS X: 33.8 MB
- Type: PDF software
- License: GNU General Public License v3
- Website: utopiadocs.com

Utopia Documents is a semantic, scientific, web-enabled PDF reader that is part of the Utopia toolset, which can be downloaded for no cost.

Utopia provides links to web resources and metadata. Although Utopia is a PDF-reader, it bridges the web-connectivity gap with HTML content by making normally static PDFs fully web-enabled (as long as the user is online).

Since June 2, 2014, Utopia Documents changed their license to become open source under GPLv3.

== Versions ==
Utopia Documents v. 3.1 is available for Microsoft Windows (XP, Vista and Windows 7), Mac (OS X 10.6 (Snow Leopard) and above) and Linux (beta).

== Software Features ==
Utopia Documents can be used in the same way as any other PDF reader, such as Adobe Acrobat Reader or the Preview application on a Mac. The application's workspace is split into three main panes (which can be collapsed): the PDF file itself is displayed on the left, a 'pager' is displayed at the bottom, and a sidebar to the right. The pager allows you to scan back and forth through the document and to move rapidly from one page to another. Although you can use Utopia Documents to look at any PDF file, the software really comes into its own as a reader for scholarly papers in the biomedical and biochemical fields.

- Free PDF reader available for Windows, Mac and Linux (beta)
- Recognizes a document by creating a unique ‘fingerprint’ of its contents as it is rendered and associates it with any version of the article, even if it is a manuscript version deposited into an institutional repository
- Fingerprints are created on the basis of interalia or key typographical and bibliometric characteristics (authors, figures, references etc.) A PDF is "transformed from a digital facsimile of its printed counterpart into a gateway to related knowledge, providing the research community with focused interactive access to analysis tools, external resources and the literature"
- Direct link-outs from highlighted text to various data sources, scientific information, and search tools
- Article impact metrics e.g. altmetrics are included when available to allow readers to view article data
- Comments feature to allow researchers to make private comments or publicly discuss an article
- Export of tables into spreadsheets and 'toggle' converting numerical tables into scatter plots
- Optimized for life science-biomedical-biochemical scientific disciplines
- Relies on external services; accessed via plugins whose appearance in the interface is mediated by a ‘semantic core’ for processing and analyzing data

== Data Sources ==
The following data sources are accessed in Utopia Documents and activated automatically whenever there is relevant content to display:

- Altmetric
- AQnowledge
- CrossRef
- Dryad (repository)
- G protein-coupled receptor
- Mendeley
- NucleaRDB
- PubMed
- Reflect
- Royal Society of Chemistry
- SciBite
- Semantic Biochemical Journal
- SHERPA/RoMEO
