= Doctoral Training Centre =

UK centers for managing PhDs

Doctoral Training Centres (DTCs; also called Centres for Doctoral Training or Doctoral Training Partnerships) are centres for managing the Research Council-funded PhD degrees in the United Kingdom. Typical UK PhD students take three years to complete their doctoral research under the guidance of an academic supervisor or small supervisory team and tend to be located within an existing research group. By contrast, each DTC involves a UK university (or a small number of universities) in delivering a four-year doctoral training programme to a significant number of PhD students organised into cohorts. Each Centre targets a specific area of research, and also emphasises transferable skills training. The model has been adopted by all seven Research Councils.

== History ==
Initially, DTCs were regarded as a strategic mechanism for increasing capacity in interdisciplinary research activities such as the life sciences interface and complexity science, areas that were difficult to locate within a traditional university's departmental organisation. By 2009, the Engineering and Physical Sciences Research Council (EPSRC) had widened its focus, announcing funding for 50 new DTCs spanning its entire remit. In 2011, following the lead of the EPSRC, the Economic and Social Research Council (ESRC) announced doctoral studentships will be exclusively allocated to a network of 21 accredited DTCs.

By 2012 the model was adopted by the Arts and Humanities Research Council (AHRC) in their second call for Block Grant Partnerships, ultimately funding 11 Doctoral Training Partnerships (DTPs) and a further 7 Centres for Doctoral Training (CDTs) established with a first intake of students in October 2014.
