= Ferranti Mercury =

Early commercial computer

The Mercury was an early commercial computer from the mid-1950s built by Ferranti. It was the successor to the Ferranti Mark 1, adding a floating-point unit for improved performance, and increased reliability by replacing the Williams tube memory with core memory and using more solid-state components. The computer had roughly 2000 vacuum tubes (mostly type CV2179/A2134 pentodes, EL81 pentodes and CV2493/ECC88 double triodes) and 2000 germanium diodes. Nineteen Mercuries were sold before Ferranti moved on to newer designs.

== Predecessor: Mark I ==
When the Mark I started running in 1951, reliability was poor. The primary concern was the drum memory system, which frequently broke down. Additionally, the machine used 4,200 thermionic valves, mostly EF50 pentodes and diodes that had to be replaced constantly. The Williams tubes, used as random-access memory and registers, were reliable but required constant maintenance. As soon as the system went into operation, teams started looking at solutions to these problems.

One team decided to produce a much smaller and more cost-effective system built entirely with transistors. It first ran in November 1953 and is believed to be the first entirely transistor-based computer. Metropolitan-Vickers later built this commercially as the Metrovick 950, delivering seven. At the time, transistors were very expensive, compared to tubes.

== Prototype: Meg ==
Another team, including the main designers of the Mark I, started with a design very similar to the Mark I but replacing valves used as diodes with solid-state diodes. These were much less expensive than transistors, yet enough of them were used in the design that replacing just the diodes would still result in a significant simplification and improvement in reliability.

At that time computers were used almost always in the sciences, and they decided to add a floating-point unit to greatly improve performance in this role. Additionally the machine was to run at 1 MHz, eight times faster than the Mark I's 125 kHz, leading to the use of the name megacycle machine, and eventually Meg.

Meg first ran in May 1954. The use of solid-state diodes reduced valve count by well over half, reducing the power requirement from the Mark I's 25 kW to the Meg's 12 kW. Like the Mark I, Meg was based on a 10-bit "short word", combining two to form a 20-bit address and four to make a 40-bit integer. This was a result of the physical properties of the Williams tubes, which were used to make eight B-lines, or in modern terminology, accumulator/index registers.

Meg could multiply two integers in about 60 microseconds. The floating-point unit used three words for a 30-bit mantissa, and another as a 10-bit exponent. It could add two floating-point numbers in about 180 microseconds, and multiply them in about 360 microseconds.

== Commercial version: Mercury ==
Ferranti, which had built the Mark I for the university, continued development of the prototype Meg to produce the Mercury. The main change was to replace the Williams tubes with core memory. Although slower to access, at about 10 μs for a 10-bit short word, the system required virtually no maintenance, considerably more important for commercial users. 1024×40-bits of core were provided, backed by four drums each holding 4096×40-bits.

The first of an eventual 19 Mercury computers was delivered in August 1957. Manchester University received one in February 1958, leasing half the time to commercial users via Ferranti's business unit. Both CERN at Geneva and the Atomic Energy Research Establishment at Harwell also installed theirs in 1958. A Mercury bought in 1959 was the UK Met Office's first computer. The University of Buenos Aires in Argentina received another one in 1960; details of Clementina, as it was nicknamed, are on Spanish Wikipedia.

The machine could run Mercury Autocode, a simplified coding system of the type later described as a high-level programming language. Detailed information about both the Mercury hardware and the Autocode coding system is included in a downloadable Spanish-language Autocode manual.

Mercury weighed 2,500 pounds (1.3 short tons; 1.1 t).

== See also ==
- Manchester computers
- List of vacuum tube computers
