= Dietrich Prinz =

German-born physicist and computer scientist

Dietrich Gunther Prinz
- Dietrich Günther Prinz
- Born: March 29, 1903; Berlin, Germany
- Died: December 1989 (aged 86)
- Education: University of Berlin
- Occupations: Computer science pioneer, researcher
- Employer(s): Telefunken, GEC, Bowen Instrument Company, Ferranti
- Known for: Early British computers at Ferranti, first limited chess program (1951), Ferranti Mark 1 manual
- Children: Jonathan Franklin Prinz, Daniela Prinz

Dietrich Gunther Prinz (March 29, 1903 – December 1989) was a computer science pioneer, notable for his work on early British computers at Ferranti, and in particular for developing the first limited chess program in 1951.

== Biography ==
He was born as Dietrich Günther Prinz in Berlin, Germany, in 1903. He studied physics and mathematics at the University of Berlin where Max Planck and Albert Einstein had been among his teachers. He initially went to work on electronic design at Telefunken.

He had some Jewish parentage and left Germany to join GEC in Wembley as a researcher into valve technology. During the Second World War, he was interned in Canada, and when he returned he worked first in Leeds for the Bowen Instrument Company. Prinz became a British citizen in 1947.

Prinz was recruited to the Ferranti factory at Moston, Manchester, in 1947 by Eric Grundy who was setting up a team to study the potential uses of electronic computers. After Ferranti was awarded a contract to build a production version of the Manchester computer, which would become the Ferranti Mark 1, Prinz worked closely with the University of Manchester team.

In 1948 he visited the US to learn about comparative computer advancements where he met Douglas Hartree who worked at the UCLA developing SWAC computer for U.S. National Bureau of Standards and with J. Presper Eckert and John Mauchly who worked on UNIVAC project.

Prinz wrote a manual for the Ferranti Mark 1 which was much clearer than the notoriously opaque first manual written by Alan Turing. He remained a mainstay of the programming department for thirty years. He spent some time in Italy supporting Ferranti installations there.

Prinz had learned programming on the Mark I from seminars led by Alan Turing and Cicely Popplewell. Influenced by them, and later by other colleagues including Donald Michie, Christopher Strachey and Donald Davies, he came to see chess programming as "a clue to methods that could be used to deal with structural or logistical problems in other areas, through electronic computers". Turing had also worked out an algorithm for playing chess, but Prinz's work was independent of this. The Mark I was inadequate to play a complete game of chess and Prinz concentrated on the endgame. In November 1951, his program on the Ferranti Mark I first solved a Mate-in-two problem. A description of the program was included in the 1953 book Faster Than Thought.

Prinz also developed simple logical machines with the Manchester University philosophy lecturer Wolfe Mays and also worked in the area of computer music.

He died in December 1989.

== Personal life ==
Prinz was married and had two children, Jonathan Franklin Prinz and Daniela Prinz.

== Publications ==
- Dietrich Prinz (1944). Contributions to the Theory of Automatic Controllers and Followers. Journal of Scientific Instruments.
- Dietrich Prinz (1951). Introduction to Programming on the Manchester Electronic Digital Computer.
- Dietrich Prinz (1952). Robot Chess. Research, Vol. 6, reprinted 1988 in Computer Chess Compendium.
- Dietrich Prinz (1953). The Use of General Computers for Solving Logical Problems.

Prinz also published many patents and a number of other papers on electronics.

== See also ==
- Computer chess
- Programme d'échecs de Dietrich Prinz (in French)
