= Richard Grimsdale =

Electrical engineer

- Born: 18 September 1929
- Died: 6 December 2005 (aged 76); Brighton, England
- Education: Manchester Grammar School; University of Manchester (BSc, MSc, PhD)
- Known for: Atlas computer Manchester computers
- Spouse: Shirley Roberts Grimsdale
- Scientific career
- Workplaces: University of Manchester; University of Sussex
- Thesis: Transistor Digital Computer (1955)
- Doctoral advisor: Frederic Calland Williams

Richard Lawrence Grimsdale (18 September 1929 – 6 December 2005) was a British electrical engineer and computer pioneer who helped to design the world's first transistorised computer.

== Early life and education ==
Richard Lawrence Grimsdale was born on 18 September 1929 in Australia, where his father, an English engineer, was working on construction of the suburban railway system for the Metropolitan-Vickers company. The family returned to England, where he was educated at Manchester Grammar School, and then studied electrical engineering at the University of Manchester, where he earned his Bachelor of Science, his Master of Science in 1951, writing a thesis on Computing Machines - Design of Test Programmes, and subsequently his Doctor of Philosophy, writing his thesis on the Transistor Digital Computer under the supervision of Frederic Calland Williams.

== Career ==
In 1953, whilst still a post-graduate research student at the University of Manchester, Grimsdale achieved one of the first major landmarks in his career with his design and development work on the Metrovick 950, the world's first computer made from transistors rather than valves or electromechanical devices. The computer used early point-contact transistors which were the first generation of transistors, however later developments of the machine used more advanced junction transistors which offered better performance.

Grimsdale also worked on the Ferranti Mark I computer, a commercial development of the Manchester Mark 1 computer. He also designed the 100-nanosecond read-only memory for the Atlas computer. He remained at the University of Manchester until 1960, then began to work at Associated Electrical Industries (AEI) as a research engineer. In 1967 he left AEI and joined the University of Sussex's electrical engineering faculty as a lecturer. His research at the University of Sussex included work on computer graphics, computer networking systems and VLSI accelerator chips for generating three-dimensional images.

== Personal life ==
Grimsdale died from a heart infection at his home in Brighton on 6 December 2005. He was survived by his wife Shirley Roberts Grimsdale and daughters Susan and Kathryn.
