= Barrie Chaplin =

British electrical engineer and inventor (1924–2021)

G. B. B. "Barrie" Chaplin (27 January 1924 – 12 January 2021) was a British engineer and inventor, and professor emeritus at the University of Essex where he established the Department of Electrical Engineering Science in 1966. He was selected by IET as one of its 95 inspiring engineers and technologists of the past, present, and future and he was included in an exhibition at Savoy Place.

Born in Cheshire, Chaplin was a founding father of modern electronics as one of the first to devise circuits for the transistor after its invention in the late 1940s.. Circuit designs devised by Chaplin (some with co-authors) principally in the 1950s, have since become standard building blocks for the complex analogue and digital electronic systems of today.

His career as an inventor and academic continued until his retirement in 1989. He pioneered many technology breakthroughs including the world’s first transistorised digital computer, the world’s first transistorised sampling oscilloscope and active noise and vibration cancellation technologies. His output was prolific and wide-ranging, producing a long list of patents and important technical papers and publications throughout his career. Many of his breakthroughs were aired on British television through programmes such as the technology magazine programme Tomorrow’s World.

Chaplin earned his Bachelors, Masters and PhD at Manchester University and served in the RAF during World War II. He worked in the private sector before returning to academia.

== Early life ==
Chaplin was born in the Stockport village of Romiley and began his studies at Manchester University in 1947. He received a first-class honours for his BSc electrical engineering in 1950, completed his MSc in 1951, and PhD in 1953.

During his studies he worked alongside early computing pioneers Tom Kilburn, Frederic C Williams and Alan Turing. They supported his innovative research into transistor circuits and computer design. The output of this pioneering work would be the creation of the world’s first transistorised digital computer.
