= Audrey Bates (programmer) =

British-American computer programmer (1928–2014)

- Born: Margery Audrey Bates; 1928
- Died: 2014 (aged 85–86)
- Education: University of Manchester

Margery Audrey Bates (Clayton Wallis) (1928–2014) was a British-American computer programmer who, in 1948, wrote the earliest program for lambda calculus calculations on the Manchester Mark I computer.

== Career ==
Bates graduated with a First in Mathematics from University of Manchester in the summer of 1949. She was taken on as a research student by Alan Turing, and shared an office with him and Cicely Popplewell. In 1950 Bates submitted an MSc thesis entitled "The mechanical solution of a problem in Church's Lambda calculus". This thesis documents a successful attempt to carry out higher-order logical reasoning on the extremely primitive Manchester Mark I electronic computer.

When the Manchester Mark I was commercialised by the local electronics firm Ferranti, Bates moved to work with them as a programmer. Whilst at Ferranti she composed several sections (some uncredited) of Vivian Bowdon's Faster Than Thought, a popular introduction to electronic computing.

In 1952, Bates went to work on the FERUT, the Ferranti Mark I installed at the University of Toronto. In 1955, Bates was pictured supervising the FERUT when it carried out the first automated remote access to a computer.

In 1979, Bates was working as a 'futurist' at a US military think tank.

== Personal life ==
Bates married twice and had four children. Her first husband, Ken Wallis, was a fellow Ferranti programmer; her second husband was Leigh Clayton (1927–2024) and it was under the name of Clayton that Bates published her later work.
