= Metrovick 950 =

Second-generation computer made by British company Metropolitan-Vickers

- Manufacturer: Metropolitan-Vickers
- Released: 1956
- CPU: serial
- Memory: 4096 words of 32 bits, shared between the program and the data
- Storage: 5-bit punched tape
- Predecessor: Manchester Transistor Computer
- Successor: AEI 1010
- Related: Metrovick 959

The Metrovick 950 was a transistorized computer, built from 1956 onwards by British company Metropolitan-Vickers, to the extent of six or seven machines, which were "used commercially within the company" or "mainly for internal use". The 950 appears to have been Metrovick's first and last commercial computer offering.

== Transistor Computer ==
=== Prototype ===
In November 1953 Richard Grimsdale and Douglas Webb of Manchester University first demonstrated their prototype transistorized computer using 92 point-contact transistors and 550 diodes in order to test the suitability of transistors in improving the reliability of the Manchester Mark 1 computer. This machine was similar to the Mark I, except that it did not include Williams tubes and used only the magnetic drum for main memory. The machine was based on a 48-bit word, although four bits were used for timing and thus not available for program use. This machine used thermionic valves to generate a clock frequency of 125 kHz.

The only storage used was a drum (reused from the Manchester Mark 1). This meant that the average random access time to a word in store was half a drum revolution, i.e., with 64 words on a track, 32 times the random access time for a word if it could be stored in a true RAM. In comparison, the Mark 1 had also included a number of Williams tubes to provide processor registers that dramatically sped up access to a small amount of data; thus the Transistor Computer was slower than the Mark 1. Both versions had a pseudo 2-address (or 1+1) instruction format, where the address of the next instruction to be obeyed was contained within each instruction, to facilitate "optimum programming". The drum was even used to store the Accumulator and the Current Instruction.

=== Improved version ===
By 1955 the design was re-built with a Mark I-style B-line accumulator/index register and hardware multiplier. The added circuitry brought the machine to a total of 250 transistors. It used only 150 watts of power, an astonishingly low figure in an era when machines typically used tens of kilowatts to warm their valves. The new model could add two 44-bit numbers in 1.5 drum revolutions, which, at a drum spin rate of 3000 RPM, amounted to roughly 30 milliseconds per addition. Although faster than the Mark I internally, the lack of Williams tubes made it run much more slowly; the Mark I could add two 40-bit numbers in 1.8 milliseconds.

The prototype computer (November 1953) had a simple seven-function order code and one track of 64 words for main storage. For the full-size computer (April 1955) the order code and storage were much extended and a hardware multiplier included. A third "regenerative" drum track formed an 8-word B store. Arithmetic was serial, with a pulse rate of 125,000 per second. The instruction times were directly related to the 30-millisecond drum revolution time (the basic unit being the time to read a word, i.e. 1/64th of a revolution).

The expanded 1955 machine had a total of 200 point-contact transistors and 1300 point diodes, which resulted in a power consumption of 150 watts. There were considerable reliability problems with the early batches of transistors and the average error free run in 1955 was only 1.5 hours.

== Metrovick 950 ==
Metropolitan-Vickers became interested in the design after the success the university had selling computing time on the Mark I to commercial customers. They adopted the design of the 1955 Manchester University transistor computer as the Metrovick 950. The only relevant experience in Metropolitan-Vickers was that in the early 1930s they had manufactured a mechanical calculating machine in the form of the differential analyser in conjunction with Douglas Hartree of Manchester University.

They changed all the circuits to more reliable types of junction transistors, although it appears they may have built one example with the earlier designs. The production version was known as the Metrovick 950 and was built from 1956 to the extent of six or seven machines, which were "used commercially within the company" or "mainly for internal use".

== See also ==
- Manchester computers
