= Cicely Popplewell =

British software engineer

Cicely Williams
- Born: Cicely Mary Popplewell; 29 October 1920; Bramhall, Stockport, England
- Died: 20 June 1995 (aged 74); Stockport, England
- Education: University of Cambridge (BA, MA)
- Known for: Work on Manchester Mark 1 and Ferranti Mark 1
- Spouse: George Keith Williams
- Scientific career
- Fields: Software engineering
- Workplaces: University of Manchester

Cicely Mary Williams (née Popplewell; 29 October 1920 – 20 June 1995) was a British software engineer who worked with Alan Turing on the Manchester Mark 1 computer.

== Early life and education ==
Popplewell was born on 29 October 1920 in Bramhall, Stockport, England. Her parents were Bessie (née Fazakerley) and Alfred Popplewell, a chartered accountant. She attended Sherbrook Private Girls School at Greaves Hall in Lancashire.

She studied the Mathematical Tripos at the University of Cambridge where she worked with statistics in the form of punched cards. She was considered an expert in the Brunsviga desk calculator.

She graduated with a Bachelor of Arts degree in 1942, which was converted to a Master of Arts degree in 1949 from Girton College, Cambridge.

== Career ==
In 1943 she was a Technical Assistant in the Experimental Department at Rolls-Royce Ltd. and joined the Women's Engineering Society.

In 1949 Popplewell joined Alan Turing in the Computer Machine Learning department at the University of Manchester to help with the programming of a prototype computer. At first she shared an office with Turing and Audrey Bates, a University of Manchester mathematics graduate. Her first role was to create a library for the prototype Manchester Mark 1. This included input/output routines and mathematical functions, and a reciprocal square root routine. She worked on ray tracing. She wrote the first versions of sections of the subroutines for functions like COSINE. Together they designed the programming language for the Ferranti Mark 1.

She wrote the Programmers Handbook for the Ferranti Mark 1 in 1951, reworking Turing's programming manual to make it comprehensible. Whilst Turing worked on Scheme A, an early operating system, Popplewell proposed Scheme B, which allowed for decimal numbers, in 1952.

Popplewell went on to become an advisor and administrator in the newly formed University of Manchester Computing Service where she was remembered as a 'universally liked' mother-figure. She left the Service in the late 1960s shortly before her marriage.

Popplewell taught the first ever programming class in Argentina at the University of Buenos Aires in 1961. Her class there included the computer scientist Cecilia Berdichevsky. She was supported by the British Council.

Popplewell published the textbook Information Processing in 1962.

Her life was documented in Jonathan Swinton's 2019 book Alan Turing’s Manchester.

== Personal life ==
In 1969 Popplewell married George Keith Williams in Chapel-en-le-Frith. She died on 20 June 1995 at Stockport Infirmary, Stockport. The funeral service was held on 27 June 1995 at St John's church, Buxton, followed by a private cremation.
