= Manchester Baby =

First electronic stored-programme computer, 1948

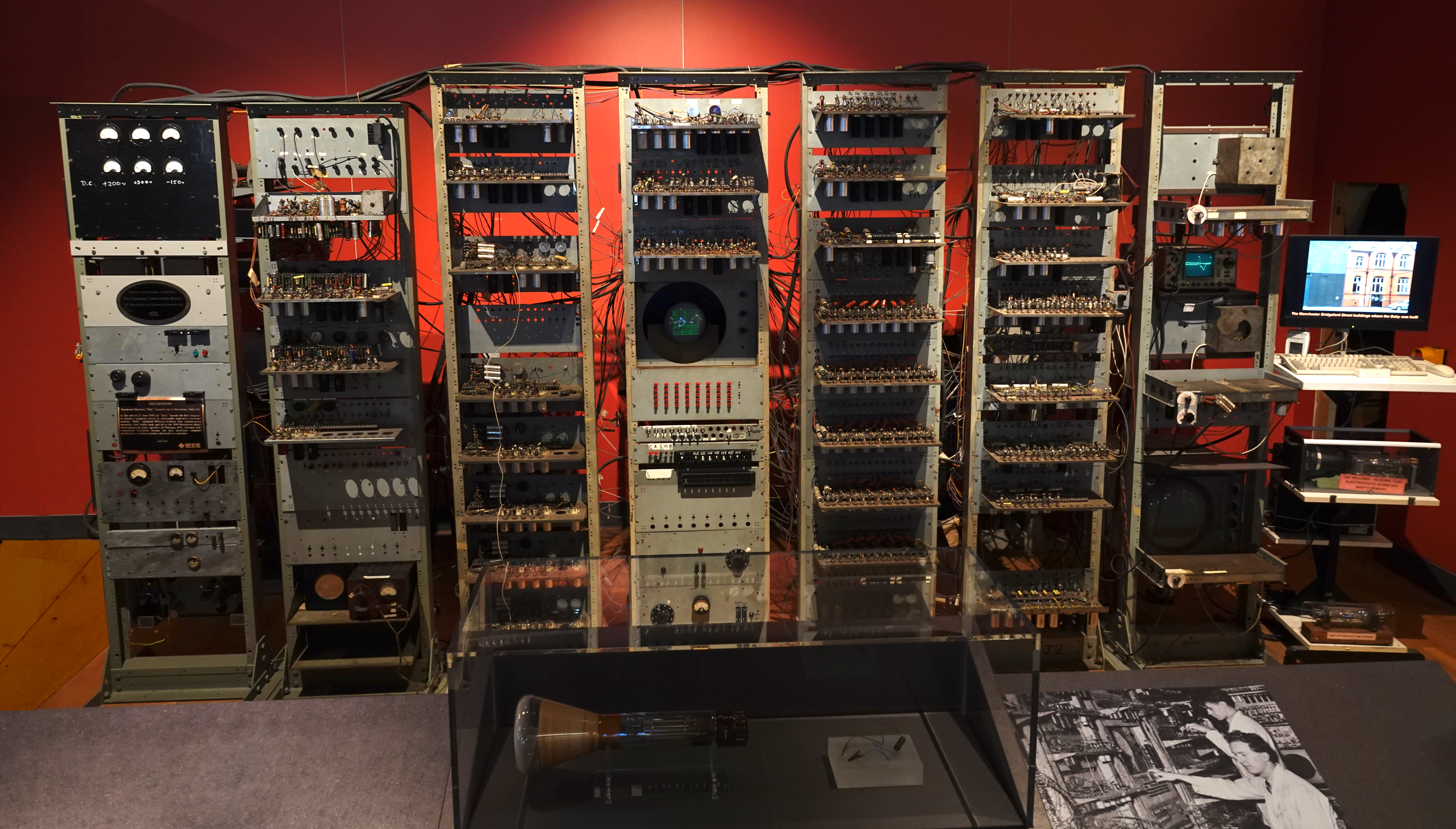
- Replica of the Baby at the Science and Industry Museum in Castlefield, Manchester
- Also known as: Small-Scale Experimental Machine
- Developer: Frederic Calland Williams; Tom Kilburn; Geoff Tootill
- Product family: Manchester computers
- Released: 21 June 1948; 78 years ago
- Memory: 1 kilobit (1,024 bits)
- Successor: Manchester Mark 1

The Manchester Baby, also called the Small-Scale Experimental Machine (SSEM), was the first electronic stored-program computer. It was built at the Victoria University of Manchester by Frederic C. Williams, Tom Kilburn, and Geoff Tootill, and ran its first program on 21 June 1948.

The Baby was not intended to be a practical computing engine, but was instead designed as a testbed for the Williams tube, the first truly random-access memory. Described as "small and primitive" 50 years after its creation, it was the first working machine to contain all the elements essential to a modern electronic digital computer. As soon as the Baby had demonstrated the feasibility of its design, a project was initiated at the university to develop it into a full-scale operational machine, the Manchester Mark 1. The Mark 1 in turn quickly became the prototype for the Ferranti Mark 1, the world's first commercially available general-purpose computer.

The Baby had a 32-bit word length and a memory of 32 words (1 kibibit, 1,024 bits). As it was designed to be the simplest possible stored-program computer, the only arithmetic operations implemented in hardware were subtraction and negation; other arithmetic operations were implemented in software. The first of three programs written for the machine calculated the highest proper divisor of 2^{18} (262,144), by testing every integer from 2^{18} downwards. This algorithm would take a long time to execute—and so prove the computer's reliability, as division was implemented by repeated subtraction of the divisor. The program consisted of 17 instructions and ran for about 52 minutes before reaching the correct answer of 131,072, after the Baby had performed about 3.5 million operations (for an effective CPU speed of about 1100 instructions per second).

== Background ==
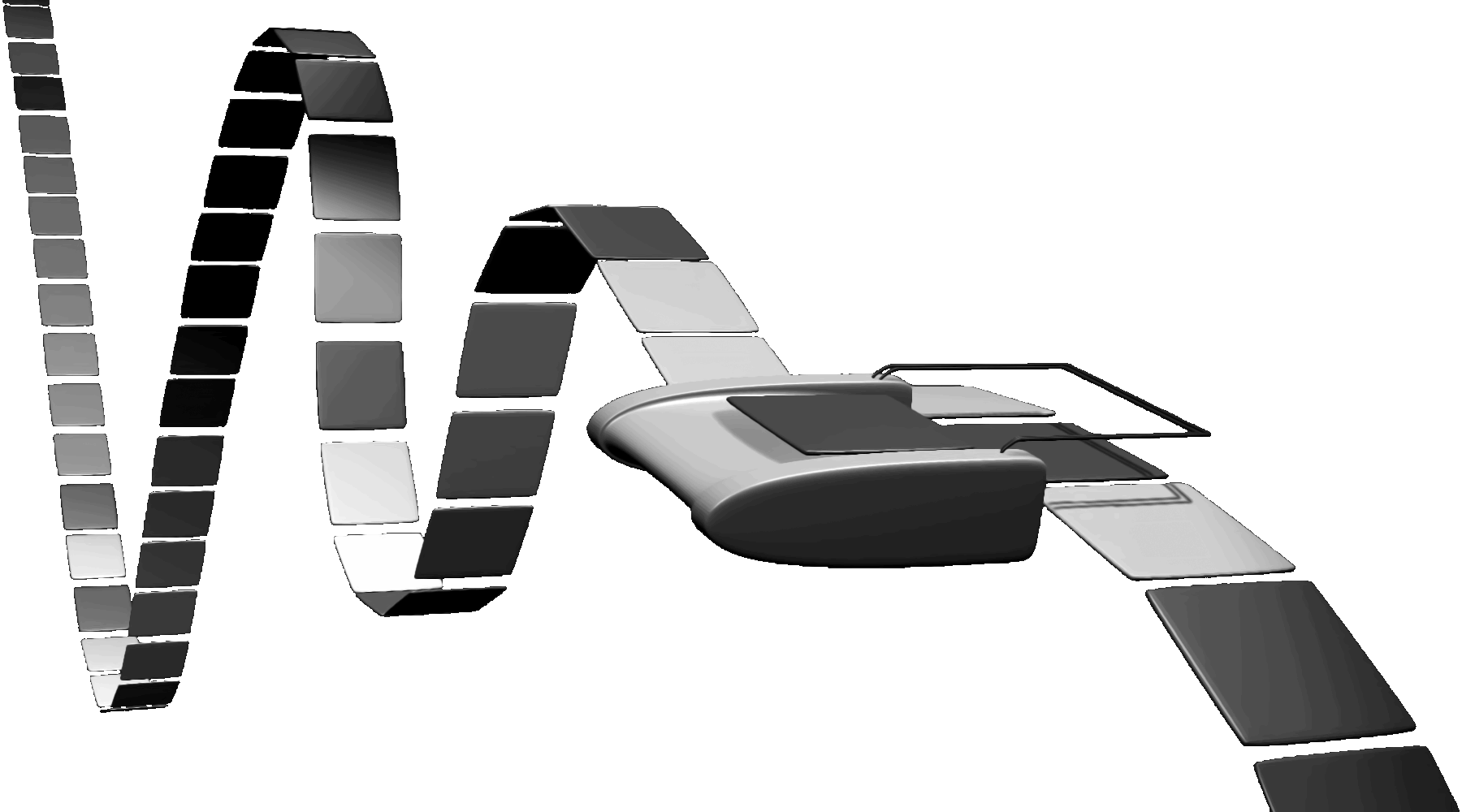
Artistic representation of a Turing machine

The first design for a program-controlled computer was Charles Babbage's Analytical Engine in the 1830s, with Ada Lovelace conceiving the idea of the first theoretical program to calculate Bernoulli numbers. A century later, in 1936, mathematician Alan Turing published his description of what became known as a Turing machine, a theoretical concept intended to explore the limits of mechanical computation. Turing was not imagining a physical machine, but a person he called a "computer", who acted according to the instructions provided by a tape on which symbols could be read and written sequentially as the tape moved under a tape head. Turing proved that if an algorithm can be written to solve a mathematical problem, then a Turing machine can execute that algorithm.

Konrad Zuse's Z3 was the world's first working programmable, fully automatic computer, with binary digital arithmetic logic, but it lacked the conditional branching of a Turing machine. On 12 May 1941, the Z3 was successfully presented to an audience of scientists of the Deutsche Versuchsanstalt für Luftfahrt ("German Laboratory for Aviation") in Berlin. The Z3 stored its program on an external tape, but it was electromechanical rather than electronic. The earliest electronic computing devices were the Atanasoff–Berry computer (ABC), which was successfully tested in 1942, and the Colossus of 1943, but neither was a stored-program machine.

The ENIAC (1946) was the first automatic computer that was both electronic and general-purpose. It was Turing complete, with conditional branching, and programmable to solve a wide range of problems, but its program was held in the state of switches in patch cords, rather than machine-changeable memory, and it could take several days to reprogram. Researchers such as Turing and Zuse investigated the idea of using the computer's memory to hold the program as well as the data it was working on, and it was mathematician John von Neumann who wrote a widely distributed paper describing that computer architecture, still used in almost all computers.

Design of the von Neumann architecture (1947)

The construction of a von Neumann computer depended on the availability of a suitable memory device on which to store the program. During the Second World War researchers working on the problem of removing the clutter from radar signals had developed a form of delay-line memory, the first practical application of which was the mercury delay line, developed by J. Presper Eckert. Radar transmitters send out regular brief pulses of radio energy, the reflections from which are displayed on a CRT screen. As operators are usually interested only in moving targets, it was desirable to filter out any distracting reflections from stationary objects. The filtering was achieved by comparing each received pulse with the previous pulse, and rejecting both if they were identical, leaving a signal containing only the images of any moving objects. To store each received pulse for later comparison it was passed through a transmission line, delaying it by exactly the time between transmitted pulses.

Turing joined the National Physical Laboratory (NPL) in October 1945, by which time scientists within the Ministry of Supply had concluded that Britain needed a National Mathematical Laboratory to co-ordinate machine-aided computation. A Mathematics Division was set up at the NPL, and on 19 February 1946 Turing presented a paper outlining his design for an electronic stored-program computer to be known as the Automatic Computing Engine (ACE). This was one of several projects set up in the years following the Second World War with the aim of constructing a stored-program computer. At about the same time, EDVAC was under development at the University of Pennsylvania's Moore School of Electrical Engineering, and the University of Cambridge Mathematical Laboratory was working on EDSAC.

The NPL did not have the expertise to build a machine like ACE, so they contacted Tommy Flowers at the General Post Office's (GPO) Dollis Hill Research Laboratory. Flowers, the designer of Colossus, the world's first programmable electronic computer, was committed elsewhere and was unable to take part in the project, although his team did build some mercury delay lines for ACE. The Telecommunications Research Establishment (TRE) was also approached for assistance, as was Maurice Wilkes at the University of Cambridge Mathematical Laboratory.

The government department responsible for the NPL decided that, of all the work being carried out by the TRE on its behalf, ACE was to be given the top priority. NPL's decision led to a visit by the superintendent of the TRE's Physics Division on 22 November 1946, accompanied by Frederic C. Williams and A. M. Uttley, also from the TRE. Williams led a TRE development group working on CRT stores for radar applications, as an alternative to delay lines. Williams was not available to work on the ACE because he had already accepted a professorship at the Victoria University of Manchester, and most of his circuit technicians were in the process of being transferred to the Department of Atomic Energy. The TRE agreed to second a small number of technicians to work under Williams' direction at the university, and to support another small group working with Uttley at the TRE.

== Williams–Kilburn tube ==
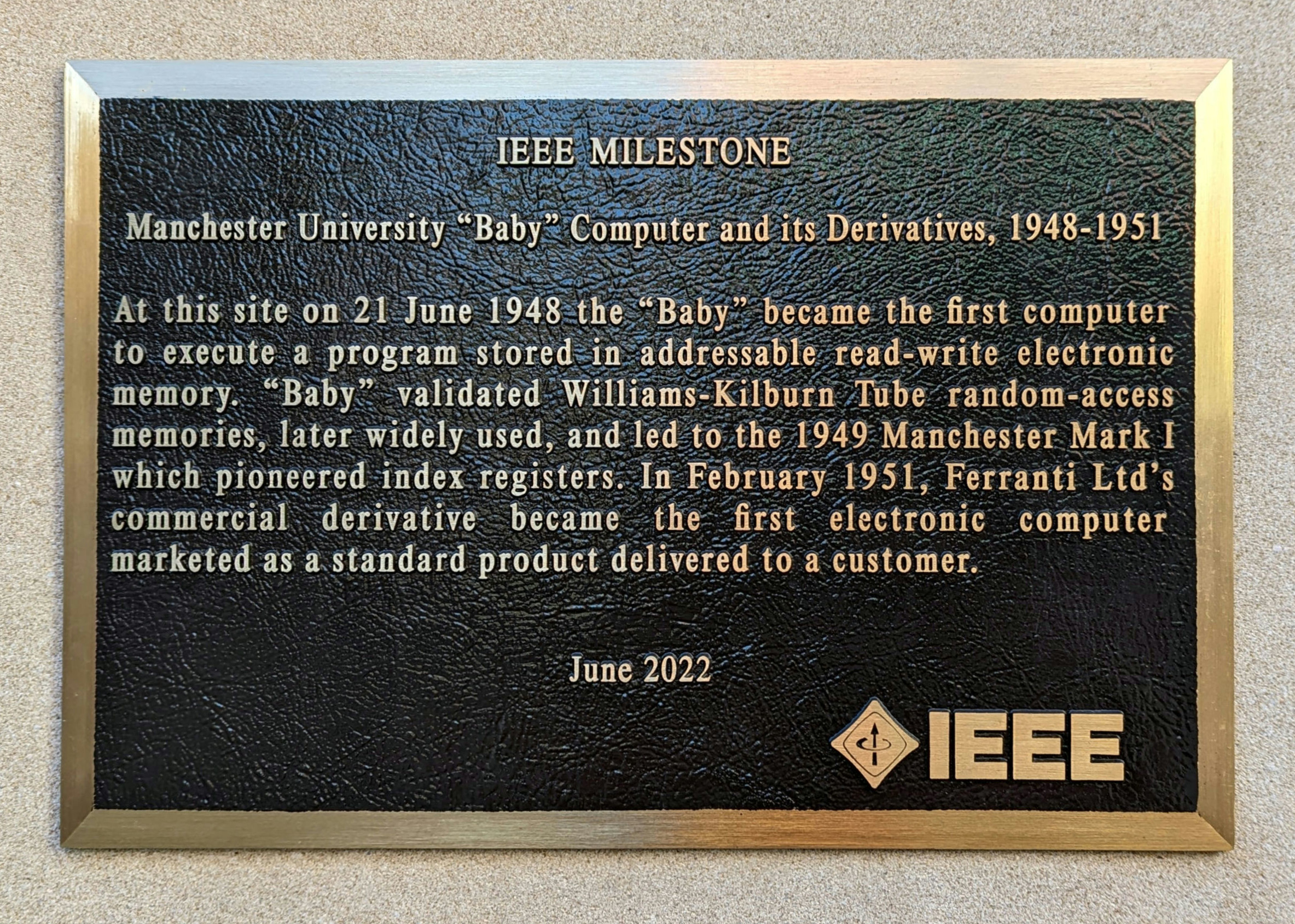
An Institute of Electrical and Electronics Engineers (IEEE) Milestone plaque commemorating the Manchester Baby and its derivatives. Caption reads: IEEE MILESTONE: Manchester University "Baby" Computer and its Derivatives, 1948-1951. At this site on 21 June 1948 the "Baby" became the first computer to execute a program stored in addressable read-write electronic memory. "Baby" validated Williams-Kilburn Tube random-access memories, later widely used, and led to the 1949 Manchester Mark I which pioneered index registers. In February 1951, Ferranti Ltd's commercial derivative became the first electronic computer marketed as a standard product delivered to a customer.

Although some early computers such as EDSAC, inspired by the design of EDVAC, later made successful use of mercury delay-line memory, the technology had several drawbacks: it was heavy, it was expensive, and it did not allow data to be accessed randomly. In addition, because data was stored as a sequence of acoustic waves propagated through a mercury column, the device's temperature had to be very carefully controlled, as the velocity of sound through a medium varies with its temperature. Williams had seen an experiment at Bell Labs demonstrating the effectiveness of cathode-ray tubes (CRT) as an alternative to the delay line for removing ground echoes from radar signals. While working at the TRE, shortly before he joined the University of Manchester in December 1946, he and Tom Kilburn had developed a form of electronic memory known as the Williams tube or Williams–Kilburn tube, based on a standard CRT: the first electronic random-access digital storage device. The Baby was designed to show that it was a practical storage device by demonstrating that data held within it could be read and written reliably at a speed suitable for use in a computer.

For use in a binary digital computer, the tube had to be capable of storing either one of two states at each of its memory locations, corresponding to the binary digits (bits) 0 and 1. It exploited the positive or negative electric charge generated by displaying either a dash or a dot at any position on the CRT screen, a phenomenon known as secondary emission. A dash generated a positive charge, and a dot a negative charge, either of which could be picked up by a detector plate in front of the screen; a negative charge represented 0, and a positive charge 1. The charge dissipated in about 0.2 seconds, but it could be automatically refreshed from the data picked up by the detector.

The Williams tube used in Baby was based on the CV1131, a commercially available 12-inch (300 mm) diameter CRT, but a smaller 6-inch (150 mm) tube, the CV1097, was used in the Mark I.

== Genesis of the project ==
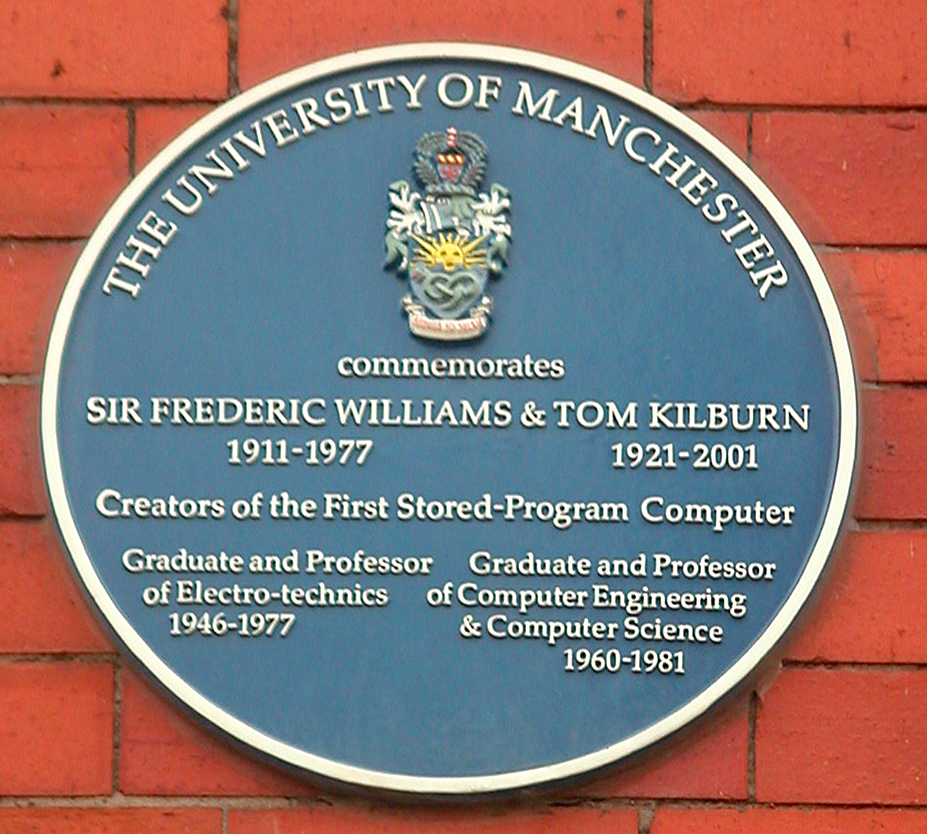
A plaque in honour of Williams and Kilburn at the University of Manchester

After developing the Colossus computer for code breaking at Bletchley Park during World War II, Max Newman was committed to the development of a computer incorporating both Alan Turing's mathematical concepts and the stored-program concept that had been described by John von Neumann. In 1945, he was appointed to the Fielden Chair of Pure Mathematics at Manchester University; he took his Colossus-project colleagues Jack Good and David Rees to Manchester with him, and there they recruited F. C. Williams to be the "circuit man" for a new computer project for which he had secured funding from the Royal Society.

Having secured the support of the university, obtained funding from the Royal Society, and assembled a first-rate team of mathematicians and engineers, Newman now had all elements of his computer-building plan in place. Adopting the approach he had used so effectively at Bletchley Park, Newman set his people loose on the detailed work while he concentrated on orchestrating the endeavor.

— David Anderson, historian

Following his appointment to the Chair of Electrical Engineering at Manchester University, Williams recruited his TRE colleague Tom Kilburn on secondment. By the autumn of 1947 the pair had increased the storage capacity of the Williams tube from one bit to 2,048, arranged in a 64 by 32-bit array, and demonstrated that it was able to store those bits for four hours. Engineer Geoff Tootill joined the team on loan from TRE in September 1947, and remained on secondment until April 1949.

Now let's be clear before we go any further that neither Tom Kilburn nor I knew the first thing about computers when we arrived at Manchester University ... Newman explained the whole business of how a computer works to us.

— Frederic Calland Williams

Kilburn had a hard time recalling the influences on his machine design:

[I]n that period, somehow or other I knew what a digital computer was ... Where I got this knowledge from I've no idea.

— Tom Kilburn

Jack Copeland explains that Kilburn's first (pre-Baby) accumulator-free (decentralized, in Jack Good's nomenclature) design was based on inputs from Turing, but that he later switched to an accumulator-based (centralized) machine of the sort advocated by von Neumann, as written up and taught to him by Jack Good and Max Newman.

The Baby's seven operation instruction set was approximately a subset of the twelve operation instruction set proposed in 1947 by Jack Good, in the first known document to use the term "Baby" for this machine. Good did not include a "halt" instruction, and his proposed conditional jump instruction was more complicated than what the Baby implemented.

== Development and design ==
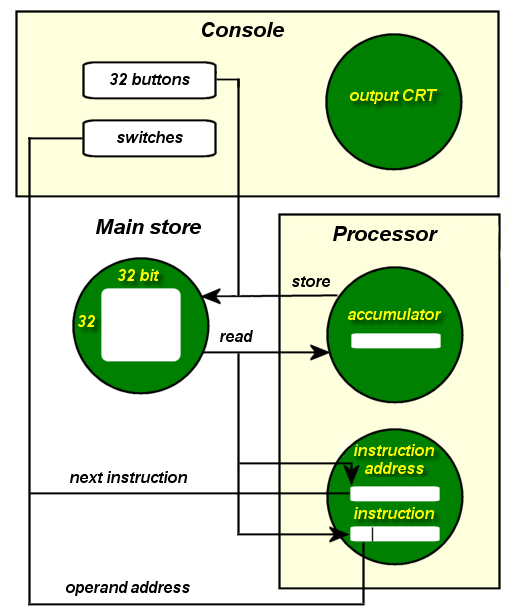
Architectural schematic showing how the four cathode-ray tubes (shown in green) were deployed

Although Newman played no engineering role in the development of the Baby, or any of the subsequent Manchester computers, he was generally supportive and enthusiastic about the project, and arranged for the acquisition of war-surplus supplies for its construction, including GPO metal racks and "...the material of two complete Colossi" from Bletchley. The construction of the Manchester Baby began in December 1947, when the CRT memory produced static pictures. The group needed to check that they could be changed and properly recorded at electronic speeds. Racks and Colossi parts were modified and assembled into chassis by Norman Stanley Hammond and others.

By June 1948 the Baby had been built and was working. It was 17 feet (5.2 m) in length, 7 feet 4 inches (2.24 m) tall, and weighed almost 1 long ton (1.0 t). The machine contained 550 valves (vacuum tubes)—300 diodes and 250 pentodes—and had a power consumption of 3500 watts. The arithmetic unit was built using EF50 pentode valves, which had been widely used during wartime. The Baby used one Williams tube to provide 32 by 32-bit words of random-access memory (RAM), a second to hold a 32-bit accumulator in which the intermediate results of a calculation could be stored temporarily, and a third to hold the current program instruction along with its address in memory. A fourth CRT, without the storage electronics of the other three, was used as the output device, able to display the bit pattern of any selected storage tube.

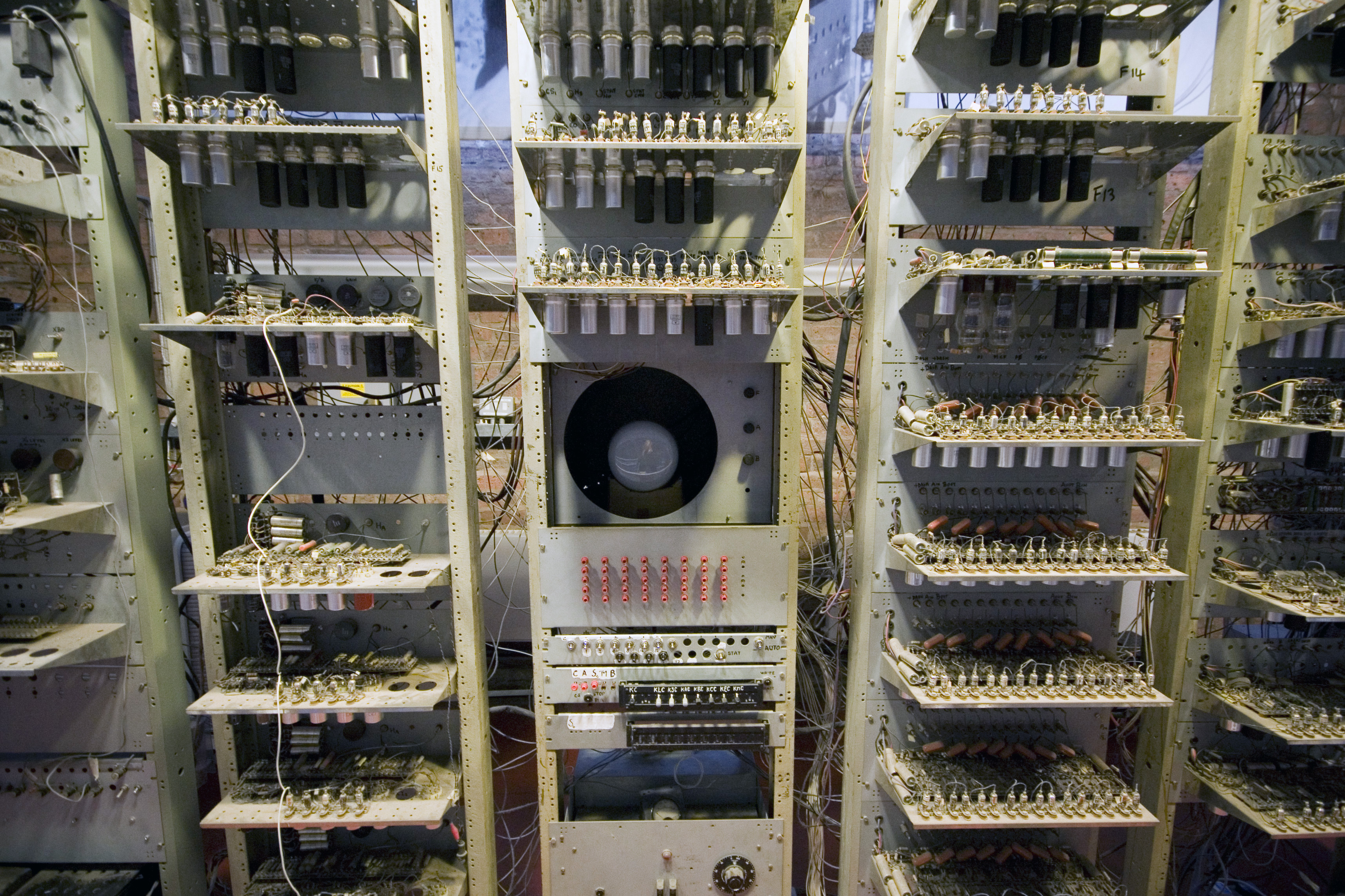
The output CRT is immediately above the input device, flanked by the monitor and control electronics.

Each 32-bit word of RAM could contain either a program instruction or data. In a program instruction, bits 0–12 represented the memory address of the operand to be used, and bits 13–15 specified the operation to be executed, such as storing a number in memory; the remaining 16 bits were unused. The Baby's single operand architecture meant that the second operand of any operation was implicit: the accumulator or the program counter (instruction address); program instructions specified only the address of the data in memory.

A word in the computer's memory could be read, written, or refreshed, in 360 microseconds. An instruction took four times as long to execute as accessing a word from memory, giving an instruction execution rate of about 700 per second. The main store was refreshed continuously, a process that took 20 milliseconds to complete, as each of the Baby's 32 words had to be read and then refreshed in sequence.

The Baby represented negative numbers using two's complement, as most computers still do. In that representation, the value of the most significant bit denotes the sign of a number; positive numbers have a zero in that position and negative numbers a one. Thus, the range of numbers that could be held in each 32-bit word was −2^{31} to +2^{31} − 1 (decimal: −2,147,483,648 to +2,147,483,647).

== Programming ==
The Baby's instruction format had a three-bit operation code field, which allowed a maximum of eight (2^{3}) different instructions. In contrast to the modern convention, the machine's storage was described with the least significant digits to the left; thus a one was represented in three bits as "100", rather than the more conventional "001".

Baby's instruction set
Binary code	Original notation	Modern mnemonic	Operation
000	S, Cl	JMP S	Jump to the instruction at the address obtained from the specified memory address S (Note: As the program counter was incremented at the end of the decoding process, the stored address had to be the target address −1.) (absolute unconditional indirect jump)
100	Add S, Cl	JRP S	Jump to the instruction at the program counter plus (+) the relative value obtained from the specified memory address S (relative unconditional jump)
010	-S, C	LDN S	Take the number from the specified memory address S, negate it, and load it into the accumulator
110	c, S	STO S	Store the number in the accumulator to the specified memory address S
001 or 101 (Note: The function bits were only partially decoded, to save on logic elements.)	SUB S	SUB S	Subtract the number at the specified memory address S from the value in accumulator, and store the result in the accumulator
011	Test	CMP	Skip next instruction if the accumulator contains a negative value
111	Stop	STP	Stop

The awkward negative operations were a consequence of the Baby's lack of hardware to perform any arithmetic operations except subtraction and negation. It was considered unnecessary to build an adder before testing could begin as addition can easily be implemented by subtraction, i.e. x+y can be computed as −(−x−y). Therefore, adding two numbers together, X and Y, required four instructions:

LDN X // load negative X into the accumulator
SUB Y // subtract Y from the value in the accumulator
STO S // store the result at S
LDN S // load negative value at S into the accumulator

Programs were entered in binary form by stepping through each word of memory in turn, and using a set of 32 buttons and switches known as the input device to set the value of each bit of each word to either 0 or 1. The Baby had no paper-tape reader or punch.

=== First programs ===
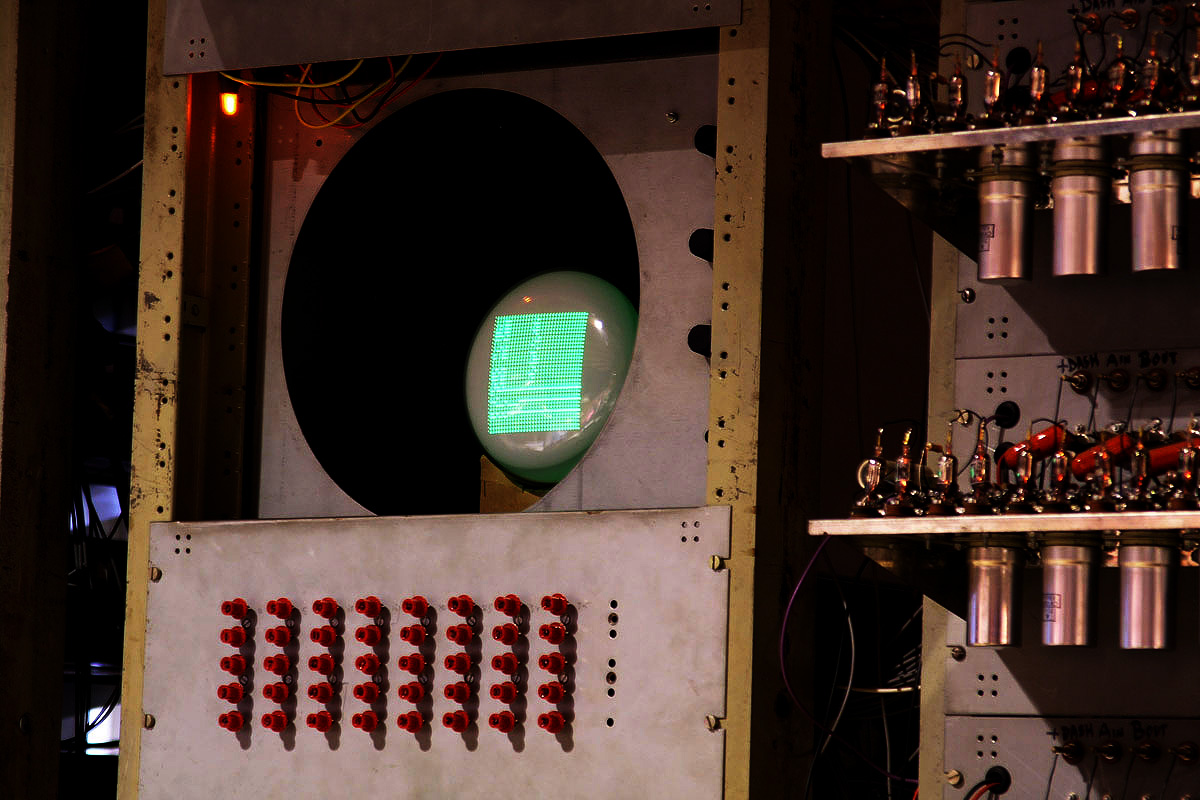
Output CRT

Three programs were written for the computer. The first, consisting of 17 instructions, was written by Kilburn, and so far as can be ascertained first ran on 21 June 1948. It was designed to find the highest proper factor of 2^{18} (262,144) by trying every integer from 2^{18} − 1 downwards. The divisions were implemented by repeated subtractions of the divisor. The Baby took 3.5 million operations and 52 minutes to produce the answer (131,072). The program used eight words of working storage in addition to its 17 words of instructions, giving a program size of 25 words.

Geoff Tootill wrote an amended version of the program the following month, and in mid-July Alan Turing—who had been appointed as a reader in the mathematics department at Manchester University in September 1948—submitted the third program, to carry out long division. Turing had by then been appointed to the nominal post of Deputy Director of the Computing Machine Laboratory at the university, although the laboratory did not become a physical reality until 1951.

== Later developments ==
Williams and Kilburn reported on the Baby in a letter to the Journal Nature, published in September 1948. The machine's successful demonstration quickly led to the construction of a more practical computer, the Manchester Mark 1, work on which began in August 1948. The first version was operational by April 1949, and it in turn led directly to the development of the Ferranti Mark 1, the world's first commercially available general-purpose computer.

== Legacy ==
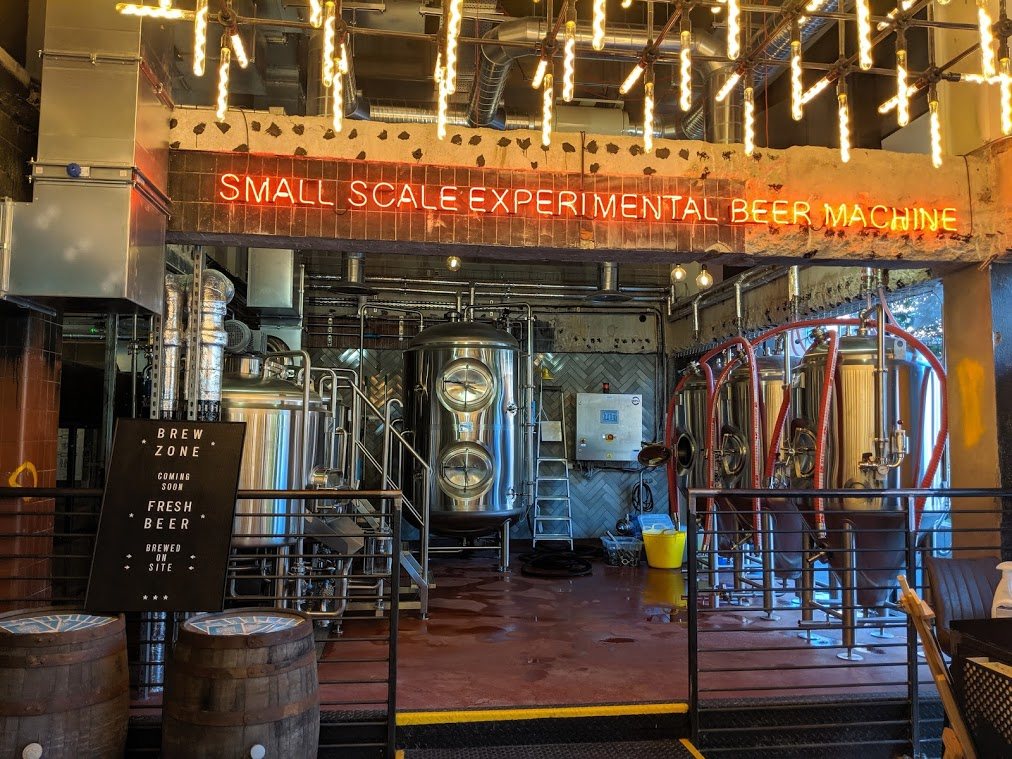
BrewDog named their microbrewery in Manchester the Small Scale Experimental Beer Machine in honour of the Small-Scale Experimental Machine (SSEM).

In 1998, a working replica of the Baby, now on display at the Museum of Science and Industry in Manchester, was built to celebrate the 50th anniversary of the running of its first program. Demonstrations of the machine in operation are held regularly at the museum.

In 2008, an original panoramic photograph of the entire machine was discovered at the University of Manchester. The photograph, taken on 15 December 1948 by a research student, Alec Robinson, had been reproduced in The Illustrated London News in June 1949.
