= Geoff Tootill =

English engineer and computer scientist

- Born: 4 March 1922; Chadderton, Lancashire, England
- Died: 26 October 2017 (aged 95)
- Education: University of Cambridge
- Known for: Manchester Baby; Ferranti Mark 1
- Scientific career
- Workplaces: University of Manchester; Telecommunications Research Establishment; Royal Aircraft Establishment; European Space Research Organisation; National Physical Laboratory; Royal Military College of Science

Geoffrey ("Geoff") Colin Tootill (4 March 1922 – 26 October 2017) was an electronic engineer and computer scientist who worked in the Electrical Engineering Department at the University of Manchester with Freddie Williams and Tom Kilburn developing the Manchester Baby, "the world's first wholly electronic stored-program computer".

== Education ==
Tootill attended King Edward's School, Birmingham on a Classics scholarship and in 1940 gained an entrance exhibition to study Mathematics at Christ's College, Cambridge. He was forced to do the course in two years (missing Part One of the Mathematics Tripos) as his studies were cut short by World War II. After the successful operation of the Manchester Baby computer, he was awarded an MSc by the Victoria University of Manchester for his thesis on "Universal High-Speed Digital Computers: A Small-Scale Experimental Machine".

== Career ==
On leaving Cambridge in 1942, Tootill managed to get assigned to work on airborne radar at the Telecommunications Research Establishment (TRE) in Malvern. Here, he went out to airfields to troubleshoot problems with the operation of radar in night fighters, designed modifications and oversaw their implementation. He later said that this was the most responsible job that he had in his life.

In 1947, he was recruited by Frederic Calland Williams to join another ex-TRE colleague, Tom Kilburn, at Manchester University developing the world's first wholly electronic stored-program computer. In the UK, three projects were then underway to develop a stored program computer (in Cambridge, the NPL and Manchester) and the main technical hurdle was the memory technology. In order to test the cathode-ray tube (CRT) memory designed by FC Williams when it was constructed, Kilburn and Tootill designed an elementary computer, known as the "Manchester Baby". The computer could store 32 instructions or numbers using a single CRT. On 21 June 1948, after months of patient work constructing and testing the Baby piece by piece, coping with the unreliable electronic components of the day, the machine finally ran a routine written by Kilburn (they didn't use the word "program" then) to find the highest proper factor of a number. In Tootill's words "And we saw the thing had done a computation". A day or two later, the Baby ran successfully for 52 minutes to find the highest proper factor of 2^{18}, which required c. 3.5m arithmetic operations.

After the Baby's first operation in June 1948, Alan Turing moved to Manchester so he could use the Baby for a project that he was working on at the National Physical Laboratory, where they had also been working on developing a computer. Tootill instructed Alan Turing on use of the Manchester Baby and debugged a program Turing had written to run on the Baby.

In 1949, Tootill joined Ferranti where he developed the logic design of the first commercial computer (which was based on the Baby). He stayed at Ferranti only briefly and later the same year, he joined the Royal Military College of Science at Shrivenham as a Senior Lecturer on a considerably higher salary, lecturing and leading lab studies on digital computing.

In 1956, Tootill joined the Royal Aircraft Establishment (RAE), Farnborough, researching issues for air traffic control systems. Here he wrote, with Stuart Hollingdale, "Electronic Computers", Penguin 1965, which ran through eight printings and was translated into Spanish and Japanese. Tootill was also a founding member of the British Computer Society in 1956.

In 1963, Tootill joined the newly formed European Space Research Organisation (ESRO, now the European Space Agency). He set up and directed the Control Centre of ESRO, with its ground stations. In 1969, he was assigned to a bureaucratic post in London, which he did not enjoy. In 1973, he joined the National Physical Laboratory at Teddington, where he developed communications standards for the European Informatics Network, an experimental computer network.

Tootill retired in 1982, but remained active in computing.

In 1997, drawing on his linguistics background (notably Latin, Greek, French and German), he designed a phonetic algorithm for encoding English names (to recognise that e.g. Deighton and Dayton, Shore and Shaw sound the same) which garnered over 2,000 corporate users as part of a data matching package developed by his son Steve.

In 1998, the Computer Conservation Society (in a project led by Christopher P Burton) unveiled a replica of the Baby (which is now in the Museum of Science and Industry (Manchester)) to commemorate the 50th anniversary of the running of the first electronically stored program, based in large part on Tootill's notes and recollections. A page from his June 1948 notebook details the code of the first ever software program, written by Tom Kilburn.

== Personal life ==
As a boy, Tootill was interested in electronics, and built a radio set. He met Pamela Watson while in Malvern during World War II, where they were both members of the "Flying Rockets Concert Party". He and Pam were married in 1947 and had three sons, Peter, Colin and Stephen and two grandchildren, Mia and Duncan.

His first wife Pam died in 1979, and in 1981, Tootill married Joyce Turnbull, who died in 2020.

== Books ==
- Hollingdale, S. H.; Tootill, G. C. (1965). Electronic Computers. Pelican Books. ASIN B000XFPPMA.
