= Manchester computers =

Series of stored-program electronic computers

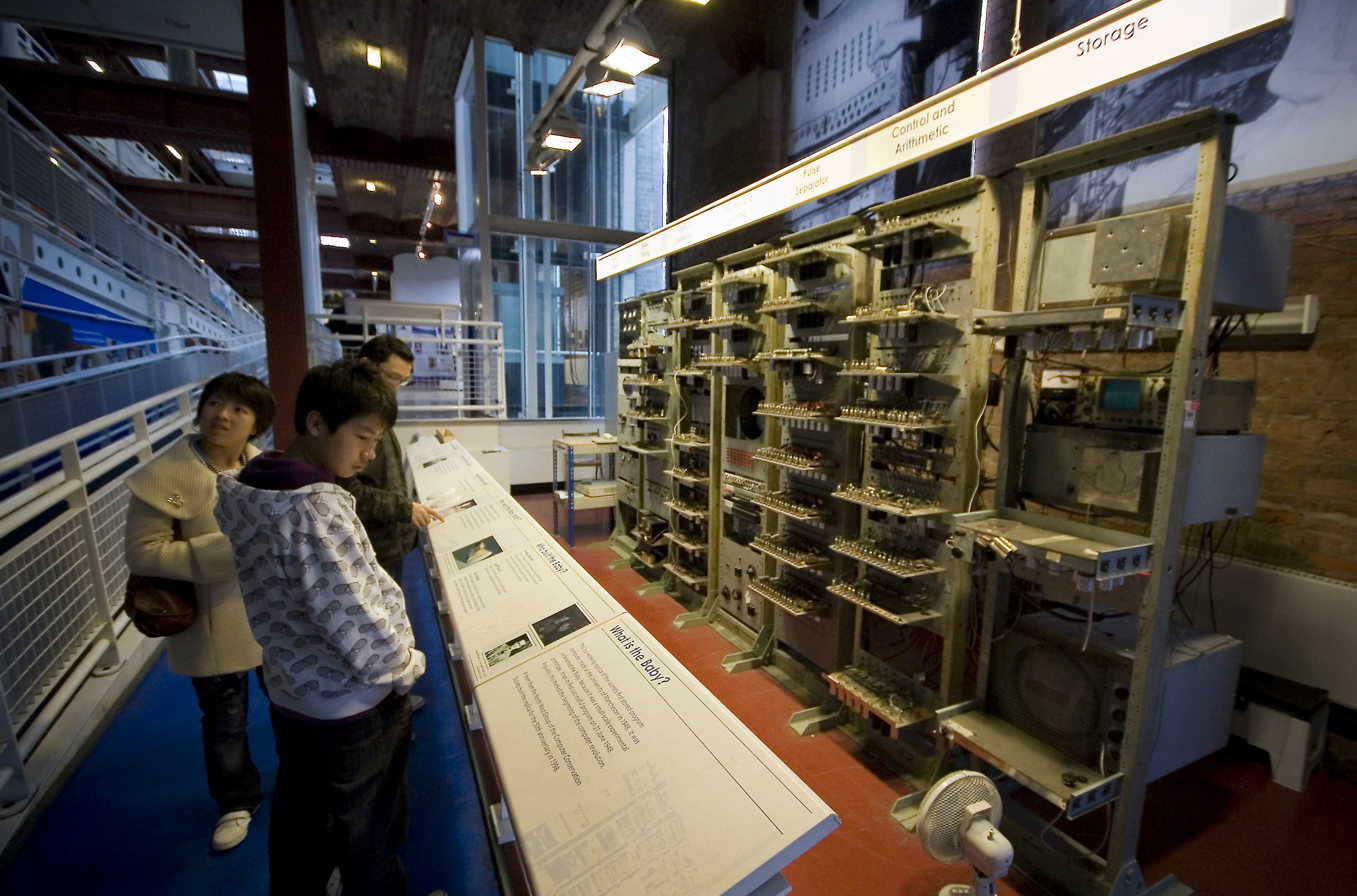
Replica of the Manchester Baby at the Science and Industry Museum in Manchester

The Manchester computers were an innovative series of stored-program electronic computers developed during the 30-year period between 1947 and 1977 by a small team at the University of Manchester, under the leadership of Tom Kilburn. They included the world's first stored-program computer, the world's first transistorised computer, and what was the world's fastest computer at the time of its inauguration in 1962.

The project began with two aims: to prove the practicality of the Williams tube, an early form of computer memory based on standard cathode-ray tubes (CRTs); and to construct a machine that could be used to investigate how computers might be able to assist in the solution of mathematical problems. The first of the series, the Manchester Baby, ran its first program on 21 June 1948. As the world's first stored-program computer, the Baby, and the Manchester Mark 1 developed from it, quickly attracted the attention of the United Kingdom government, who contracted the electrical engineering firm of Ferranti to produce a commercial version. The resulting machine, the Ferranti Mark 1, was the world's first commercially available general-purpose computer.

The collaboration with Ferranti eventually led to an industrial partnership with the computer company ICL, who made use of many of the ideas developed at the university, particularly in the design of their 2900 series of computers during the 1970s.

== Manchester Baby ==
The Manchester Baby was designed as a test-bed for the Williams tube, an early form of computer memory, rather than as a practical computer. Work on the machine began in 1947, and on 21 June 1948 the computer successfully ran its first program, consisting of 17 instructions written to find the highest proper factor of 2^{18} (262,144) by trying every integer from 2^{18} − 1 downwards. The program ran for 52 minutes before producing the correct answer of 2^{17} (131,072).

The Baby was 17 feet (5.2 m) in length, 7 feet 4 inches (2.24 m) tall, and weighed almost 1 long ton. It contained 550 thermionic valves – 300 diodes and 250 pentodes – and had a power consumption of 3.5 kilowatts. Its successful operation was reported in a letter to the journal Nature published in September 1948, establishing it as the world's first stored-program computer. It quickly evolved into a more practical machine, the Manchester Mark 1.

== Manchester Mark 1 ==
Development of the Manchester Mark 1 began in August 1948, with the initial aim of providing the university with a more realistic computing facility. In October 1948 UK Government Chief Scientist Ben Lockspeiser was given a demonstration of the prototype, and was so impressed that he immediately initiated a government contract with the local firm of Ferranti to make a commercial version of the machine, the Ferranti Mark 1.

Two versions of the Manchester Mark 1 were produced, the first of which, the Intermediary Version, was operational by April 1949. The Final Specification machine, which was fully working by October 1949, contained 4,050 valves and had a power consumption of 25 kilowatts. Perhaps the Manchester Mark 1's most significant innovation was its incorporation of index registers, commonplace on modern computers.

In June 2022 an IEEE Milestone was dedicated to the "Manchester University "Baby" Computer and its Derivatives, 1948-1951".

== Meg and Mercury ==
As a result of experience gained from the Mark 1, the developers concluded that computers would be used more in scientific roles than pure maths. They therefore embarked on the design of a new machine which would include a floating-point unit; work began in 1951. The resulting machine, which ran its first program in May 1954, was known as Meg, or the megacycle machine. It was smaller and simpler than the Mark 1, as well as quicker at solving maths problems. Ferranti produced a commercial version marketed as the Ferranti Mercury, in which the Williams tubes were replaced by the more reliable core memory.

== Transistor Computer ==
Work on building a smaller and cheaper computer began in 1952, in parallel with Meg's ongoing development. Two of Kilburn's team, Richard Grimsdale and D. C. Webb, were assigned to the task of designing and building a machine using the newly developed transistors instead of valves, which became known as the Manchester TC. Initially the only devices available were germanium point-contact transistors; these were less reliable than the valves they replaced but consumed far less power.

Two versions of the machine were produced. The first was the world's first transistorised computer, a prototype, and became operational on 16 November 1953. "The 48-bit machine used 92 point-contact transistors and 550 diodes". The second version was completed in April 1955. The 1955 version used 250 junction transistors, 1,300 solid-state diodes, and had a power consumption of 150 watts. The Manchester TC did however make use of valves to generate its 125 kHz clock waveforms and in the circuitry to read and write on its magnetic drum memory, so it was not the first completely transistorised computer, a distinction that went to the Harwell CADET of 1955.

Problems with the reliability of early batches of transistors meant that the Manchester TC's mean time between failures was about 90 minutes, which improved once the more reliable junction transistors became available. The Transistor Computer's design was adopted by the local engineering firm of Metropolitan-Vickers in their Metrovick 950, in which all the circuitry was modified to make use of junction transistors. Six Metrovick 950s were built, the first completed in 1956. They were successfully deployed within various departments of the company and were in use for about five years.

== Muse and Atlas ==
Development of MUSE – a name derived from "microsecond engine" – began at the university in 1956. The aim was to build a computer that could operate at processing speeds approaching one microsecond per instruction, one million instructions per second. Mu (or μ) is a prefix in the SI and other systems of units denoting a factor of 10^{−6} (one millionth).

At the end of 1958 Ferranti agreed to collaborate with Manchester University on the project, and the computer was shortly afterwards renamed Atlas, with the joint venture under the control of Tom Kilburn. The first Atlas was officially commissioned on 7 December 1962, and was considered at that time to be the most powerful computer in the world, equivalent to four IBM 7094s. It was said that whenever Atlas went offline half of the UK's computer capacity was lost. Its fastest instructions took 1.59 microseconds to execute, and the machine's use of virtual storage and paging allowed each concurrent user to have up to one million words of storage space available. Atlas pioneered many hardware and software concepts still in common use today including the Atlas Supervisor, "considered by many to be the first recognisable modern operating system".

Two other machines were built: one for a joint British Petroleum/University of London consortium, and the other for the Atlas Computer Laboratory at Chilton near Oxford. A derivative system was built by Ferranti for Cambridge University, called the Titan or Atlas 2, which had a different memory organisation, and ran a time-sharing operating system developed by Cambridge Computer Laboratory.

The University of Manchester's Atlas was decommissioned in 1971, but the last was in service until 1974. Parts of the Chilton Atlas are preserved by the National Museums of Scotland in Edinburgh.

In June 2022 an IEEE Milestone was dedicated to the "Atlas Computer and the Invention of Virtual Memory 1957–1962".

== MU5 ==
The Manchester MU5 was the successor to Atlas. An outline proposal for a successor to Atlas was presented at the 1968 IFIP Conference in Edinburgh, although work on the project and talks with ICT (of which Ferranti had become part) aimed at obtaining their assistance and support had begun in 1966. The new machine, later to become known as MU5, was intended to be at the top end of a range of machines and to be 20 times faster than Atlas.

In 1968 the Science Research Council (SRC) awarded Manchester University a five-year grant of £630,466 (equivalent to £12.5 million in 2024) (Note: United Kingdom Gross Domestic Product deflator figures follow the MeasuringWorth "consistent series" supplied in Thomas, Ryland; Williamson, Samuel H. (2026). "What Was the U.K. GDP Then?". MeasuringWorth.) to develop the machine and ICT, later to become ICL, made its production facilities available to the university. In that year a group of 20 people was involved in the design: 11 Department of Computer Science staff, 5 seconded ICT staff and 4 SRC supported staff. The peak level of staffing was in 1971, when the numbers, including research students, rose to 60.

The most significant novel features of the MU5 processor were its instruction set and the use of associative memory to speed up operand and instruction accesses, highly beneficial as the processor basic cycle time was five times faster than main memory access. The instruction set was designed to permit the generation of efficient object code by compilers, to allow for a pipeline organisation of the processor and to provide information to the hardware on the nature of operands, so as to allow them to be optimally buffered. Thus named variables were buffered separately from array elements, which were themselves accessed by means of named descriptors. Each descriptor included an array length which could be used in string processing instructions or to enable array bound checking to be carried out by hardware. The instruction pre-fetching mechanism used an associative jump trace to predict the outcome of impending branches.

The MU5 operating system MUSS was designed to be highly adaptable and was ported to a variety of processors at Manchester and elsewhere. In the completed MU5 system, three processors (MU5 itself, an ICL 1905E and a PDP-11), as well as a number of memories and other devices, were interconnected by a high-speed Exchange. All three processors ran a version of MUSS. MUSS also encompassed compilers for various languages and runtime packages to support the compiled code. It was structured as a small kernel that implemented an arbitrary set of virtual machines analogous to a corresponding set of processors. The MUSS code appeared in the common segments that formed part of each virtual machine's virtual address space.

MU5 was fully operational by October 1974, coinciding with ICL's announcement that it was working on the development of a new range of computers, the 2900 series. ICL's 2980 in particular, first delivered in June 1975, owed a great deal to the design of MU5. MU5 remained in operation at the university until 1982. A fuller article about MU5 can be found on the Engineering and Technology History Wiki.

== MU6 ==
Once MU5 was fully operational, a new project was initiated to produce its successor, MU6. MU6 was intended to be a range of processors: MU6P, an advanced microprocessor architecture intended for use as a personal computer, MU6-G, a high performance machine for general or scientific applications and MU6V, a parallel vector processing system. A prototype model of MU6V, based on 68000 microprocessors with vector orders emulated as "extracodes" was constructed and tested but not further developed beyond this. MU6-G was built with a grant from SRC and successfully ran as a service machine in the department between 1982 and 1987, using the MUSS operating system developed as part of the MU5 project.

== SpiNNaker ==
Spiking Neural Network Architecture (SpiNNaker) is a massively parallel, manycore supercomputer architecture designed by Steve Furber in the University of Manchester's Advanced Processor Technologies Research Group (APT). Built in 2019, it is composed of 57,600 ARM9 processors (specifically ARM968), each with 18 cores and 128 MB of mobile DDR SDRAM, totalling 1,036,800 cores and over 7 TB of RAM. The computing platform is based on spiking neural networks, useful in simulating the human brain (see Human Brain Project).

== Summary ==
Chronology of developments
Year	University Prototype	Year	Commercial Computer
1948	Manchester Baby, which evolved into the Manchester Mark 1	1951	Ferranti Mark 1
1953	Transistor computer	1956	Metrovick 950
1954	Manchester Mark II a.k.a. "Meg"	1957	Ferranti Mercury
1959	Muse	1962	Ferranti Atlas, Titan
1974	MU5	1974	ICL 2900 Series
