= Frederic C. Williams =

English engineer (1911–1977)

Sir Frederic C. Williams CBE FRS
- Born: Frederic Calland Williams; 26 June 1911; Romiley, Stockport
- Died: 11 August 1977 (aged 66); Manchester
- Other names: F.C. Williams; Freddie Williams
- Citizenship: British
- Education: Stockport Grammar School
- Alma mater: University of Manchester (BSc, MSc); University of Oxford (DPhil)
- Known for: Williams tube; Manchester Baby; Manchester computers
- Awards: Hughes Medal (1963); Faraday Medal (1972)
- Scientific career
- Workplaces: University of Manchester; University of Oxford; Telecommunications Research Establishment
- Thesis: Problems of spontaneous oscillation in electrical circuits (1936)
- Doctoral students: Richard Grimsdale; Tom Kilburn

Sir Frederic Calland Williams, CBE FRS (26 June 1911 – 11 August 1977), known as F.C. Williams or Freddie Williams, was an English engineer, a pioneer in radar and computer technology.

== Education ==
Williams was born in Romiley, Stockport, and educated at Stockport Grammar School. He gained a scholarship to study engineering at the University of Manchester where he was awarded Bachelor of Science and Master of Science degrees. He was awarded a Doctor of Philosophy degree in 1936 for research carried out as a postgraduate student of Magdalen College, Oxford.

== Research and career ==
Working at the Telecommunications Research Establishment (TRE), Williams was a substantial contributor during World War II to the development of radar.

In 1946 he was appointed as head of the Electrical Engineering Department of the University of Manchester. There, with Tom Kilburn and Geoff Tootill, he built the first electronic stored-program digital computer, the Manchester Baby. He delivered the Percival Lecture to the Manchester Literary & Philosophical Society, Mechanised Trial and Error: some examples of Electronic Automatic Control.

Williams is also recognised for his invention of the Williams tube, an early memory device. He supervised the research of his PhD students Richard Grimsdale and Tom Kilburn.

=== Awards and honours ===
Williams was elected a Fellow of the Royal Society (FRS) in 1950. His nomination reads

During the war F.C. Williams was the chief authority and the main source of ideas on the electrical circuits associated with many radar devices evolved at the Telecommunications Radio Establishment. Many of the extreme refinements of technique embodied in devices such as I.F.F., G.E.E. and Oboe, were due to him and were made possible by his deep knowledge of physical principles. Since the war he has developed successfully an electric storage tube for the proposed Manchester digital computing machine. The storage depends for its success on most delicate properties of wave form produced by electronic bombardment of a spot on a screen.

== Personal life ==
Williams died in Manchester in 1977, aged 66.
