= Williams tube =

Early form of computer memory

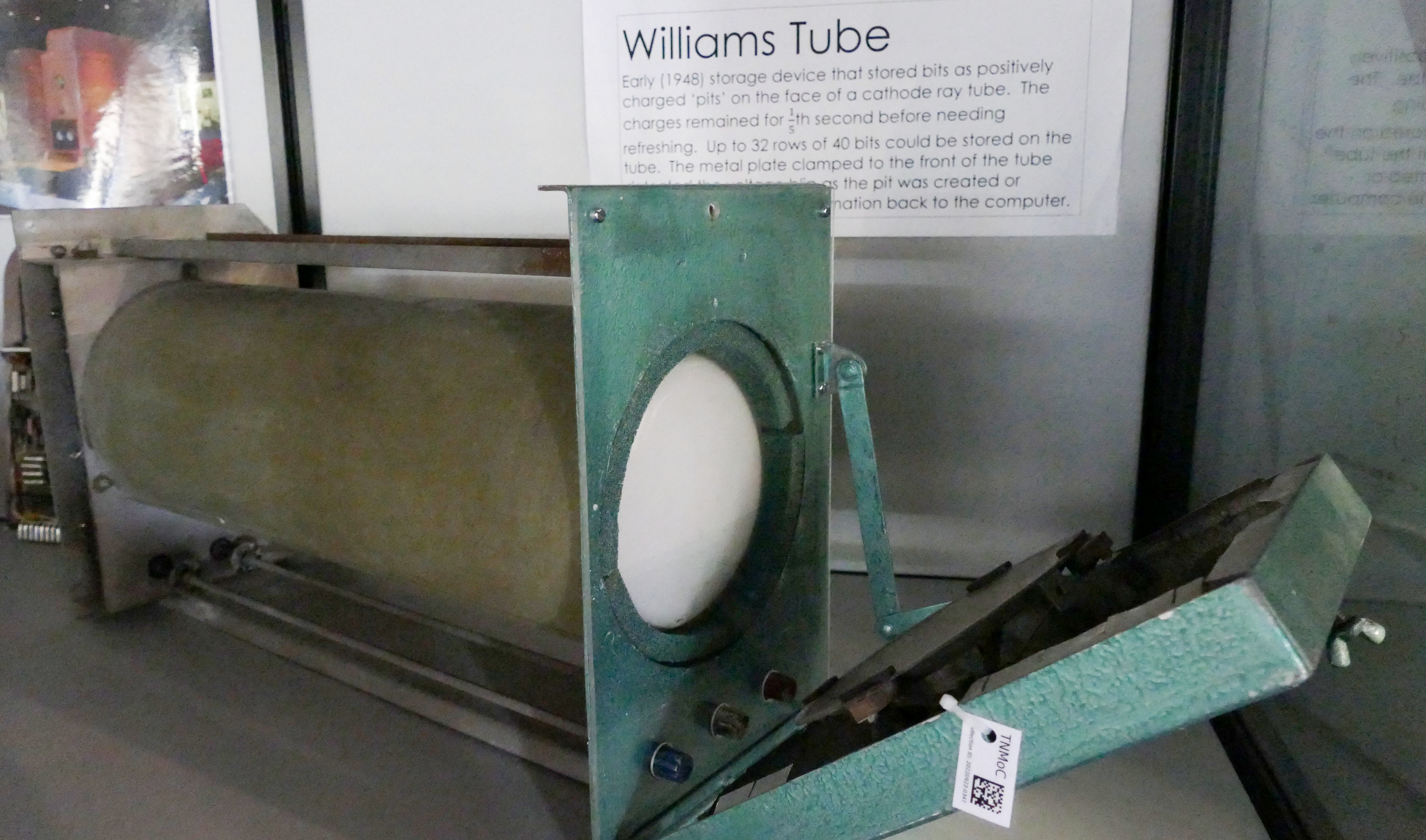
A Williams (or Williams-Kilburn) tube on display at The National Museum of Computing on Bletchley Park, Buckinghamshire

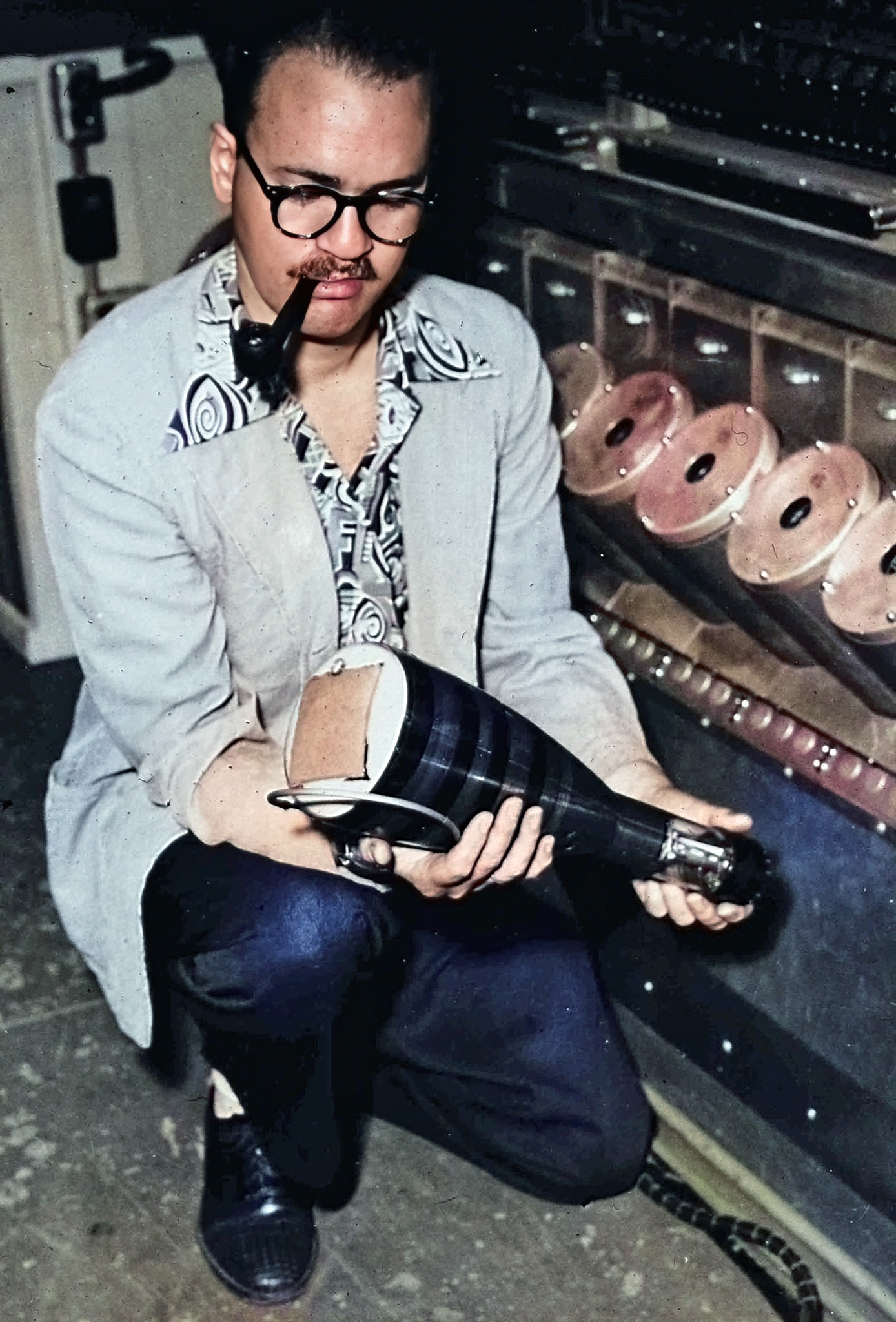
James Pomerene with a Williams–Kilburn tube, a 5CP1A cathode ray tube, used in the memory array of the IAS computer c. 1951

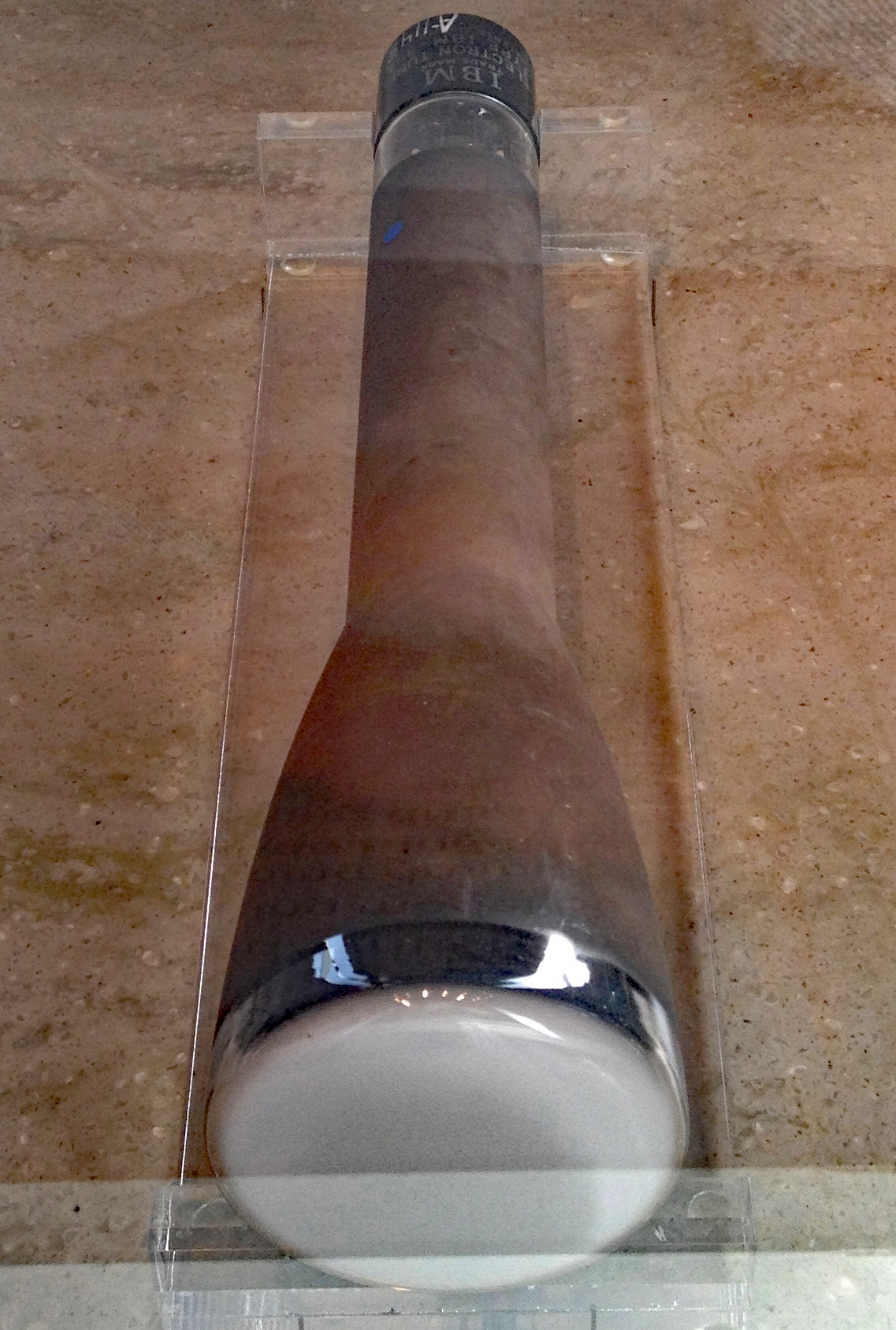
Williams–Kilburn tube from an IBM 701 at the Computer History Museum, in Mountain View, California

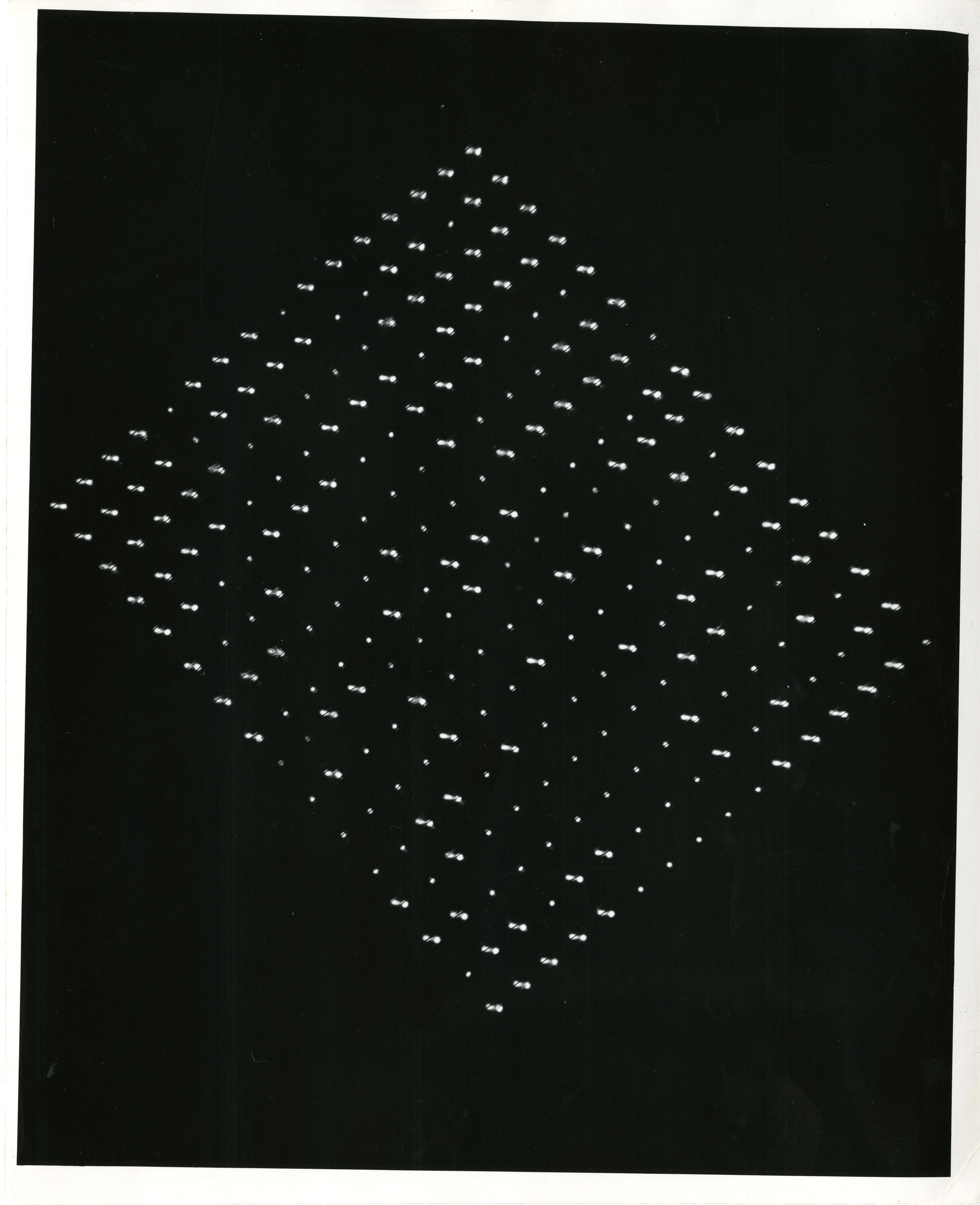
Memory pattern on SWAC Williams tube CRT

The Williams tube, or the Williams–Kilburn tube named after British inventors Freddie Williams and Tom Kilburn, is an early form of computer memory. It was the first random-access digital storage device, and was used successfully in several early computers.

The Williams tube works by displaying a grid of dots on a cathode-ray tube (CRT). Due to the way CRTs work, this creates a small charge of static electricity over each dot. The charge at the location of each of the dots is read by a thin metal sheet just in front of the display. Since the display faded over time, it was periodically refreshed. It operates faster than earlier acoustic delay-line memory, at the speed of the electrons inside the vacuum tube, rather than at the speed of sound. The system was adversely affected by nearby electrical fields, and required frequent adjustment to remain operational. Williams–Kilburn tubes were used primarily on high-speed computer designs.

Williams and Kilburn applied for British patents on 11 December 1946, and 2 October 1947, followed by United States patent applications on 10 December 1947, and 16 May 1949.

== Working principle ==
The Williams tube depends on an effect called secondary emission that occurs on cathode-ray tubes (CRTs). When the electron beam strikes the phosphor that forms the display surface, it normally causes it to illuminate. If the beam energy is above a given threshold (depending on the phosphor mix) it also causes electrons to be struck out of the phosphor. These electrons travel a short distance before being attracted back to the CRT surface and falling on it a short distance away. The overall effect is to cause a slight positive charge in the immediate region of the beam where there is a deficit of electrons, and a slight negative charge around the dot where those electrons land. The resulting charge well remains on the surface of the tube for a fraction of a second while the electrons flow back to their original locations. The lifetime depends on the electrical resistance of the phosphor and the size of the well.

=== Writing ===
The process of creating the charge well is used as the write operation in a computer memory, storing a single binary digit, or bit. A positively charged dot is erased (filling the charge well) by drawing a second dot immediately adjacent to the one to be erased (most systems did this by drawing a short dash starting at the dot position, the extension of the dash erased the charge initially stored at the starting point). This works because the negative halo around the second dot will fill in the positive center of the first dot. A collection of dots or spaces, often one horizontal row on the display, represents a computer word. Increasing beam energy makes the dots bigger and last longer, but requires them to be further apart, since otherwise, nearby dots erase each other.

The beam energy has to be large enough to produce dots with a usable lifetime. This places an upper limit on the memory density, and each Williams tube could typically store about 256 to 2560 bits of data.

Because the electron beam is essentially inertia-free and can be moved anywhere on the display, the computer can access any location, making it a random access memory. Typically, the computer would load the memory address as an X and Y pair into the driver circuitry and then trigger a time base generator to sweep the selected locations, reading from or writing to the internal registers, normally implemented with flip-flops.

=== Reading ===
Reading the memory took place via a secondary effect caused by the writing operation. During the short period when the write takes place, the redistribution of charges in the phosphor creates an electrical current that induces voltage in any nearby conductors. This is read by placing a thin metal sheet just in front of the display side of the CRT. During a read operation, the beam first writes to the selected bit locations on the display. Those locations that were previously written to are already depleted of electrons, so no current flows, and no voltage appears on the plate. This allows the computer to determine there was a "1" in that location. If the location had not been written to previously, the write process will create a well and a pulse will be read on the sheet, indicating a "0".

Reading a memory location creates a charge well whether or not one was previously there, thus destroying the original contents of that location. So any read has to be followed by a rewrite to reinstate the original data. In some systems this was accomplished using a second electron gun inside the CRT that could write to one location while the other was reading the next.

=== Refreshing ===
Since the display fades over time, the entire display has to be periodically refreshed using the same basic method. As the data is read and then immediately rewritten, this operation can be carried out by external circuitry while the central processing unit (CPU) is busy carrying out other operations. This refresh operation is similar to the memory refresh cycles of DRAM in modern systems.

=== Erasing ===
Since the refresh process caused the same pattern to continually reappear on the display, there was a need to be able to erase previously written values. This was normally accomplished by writing to the display just beside the original location. The electrons released by this new write would fall into the previously written well, filling it. The original systems produced this effect by writing a small dash, which was easy to accomplish without changing the master timers and simply producing the write current for a slightly longer period. The resulting pattern was a series of dots and dashes. There was a considerable amount of research on more effective erasing systems, with some systems using out-of-focus beams or complex patterns.

=== Visibility of data ===
Some Williams tubes were made from radar-type cathode-ray tubes with a phosphor coating that made the data visible, while other tubes were purpose-built without such a coating. The presence or absence of this coating had no effect on the operation of the tube, and was of no importance to the operators, since the face of the tube was covered by the pickup plate. If a visible output was needed, a second tube connected in parallel with the storage tube, with a phosphor coating, but without a pickup plate, was used as a display device.

== Development ==
Developed at the University of Manchester in England, it provided the program storage medium for the Manchester Baby, the first electronic stored-program computer, which first successfully ran a program on 21 June, 1948. Rather than the Williams tube memory being designed for the Baby, the Baby was a testbed to demonstrate the reliability of the memory. Tom Kilburn wrote a 17-instruction program to calculate the highest proper factor of numbers as large as 2^{18}. Tradition at the university has it that this was the only program Kilburn ever wrote.

Williams tubes tended to become unreliable with age, and most working installations had to be hand tuned. By contrast, mercury delay-line memory was slower and not random access, as the bits were presented serially, which complicated programming. Delay lines also needed hand tuning, but did not age as badly and enjoyed some success in early digital electronic computing despite their data rate, weight, cost, thermal and toxicity problems. The Manchester Mark 1, which used Williams tubes, was successfully commercialised as the Ferranti Mark 1. Some early computers in the United States also used Williams tubes, including the IAS machine (originally designed for Selectron tube memory), the UNIVAC 1103, IBM 701, IBM 702 and the Standards Western Automatic Computer (SWAC). Williams tubes were also used in the Soviet Strela-1, the Japan TAC (Tokyo Automatic Computer) and in the Swedish BESK.

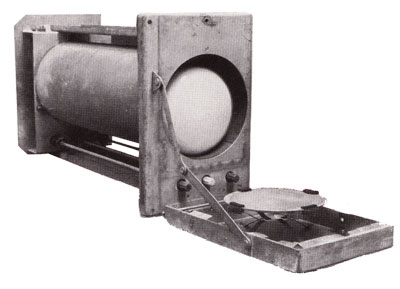
A Williams–Kilburn tube

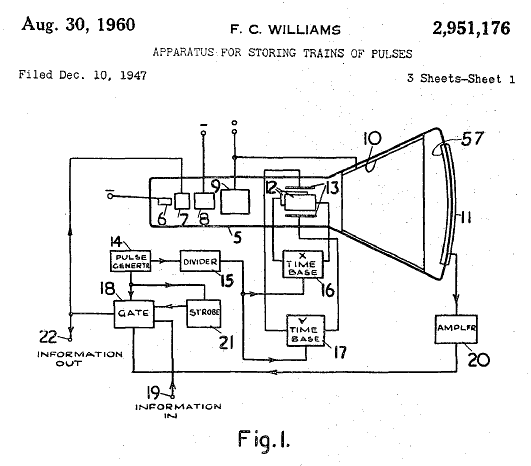
Diagram of Williams tube memory from the 1947 patent

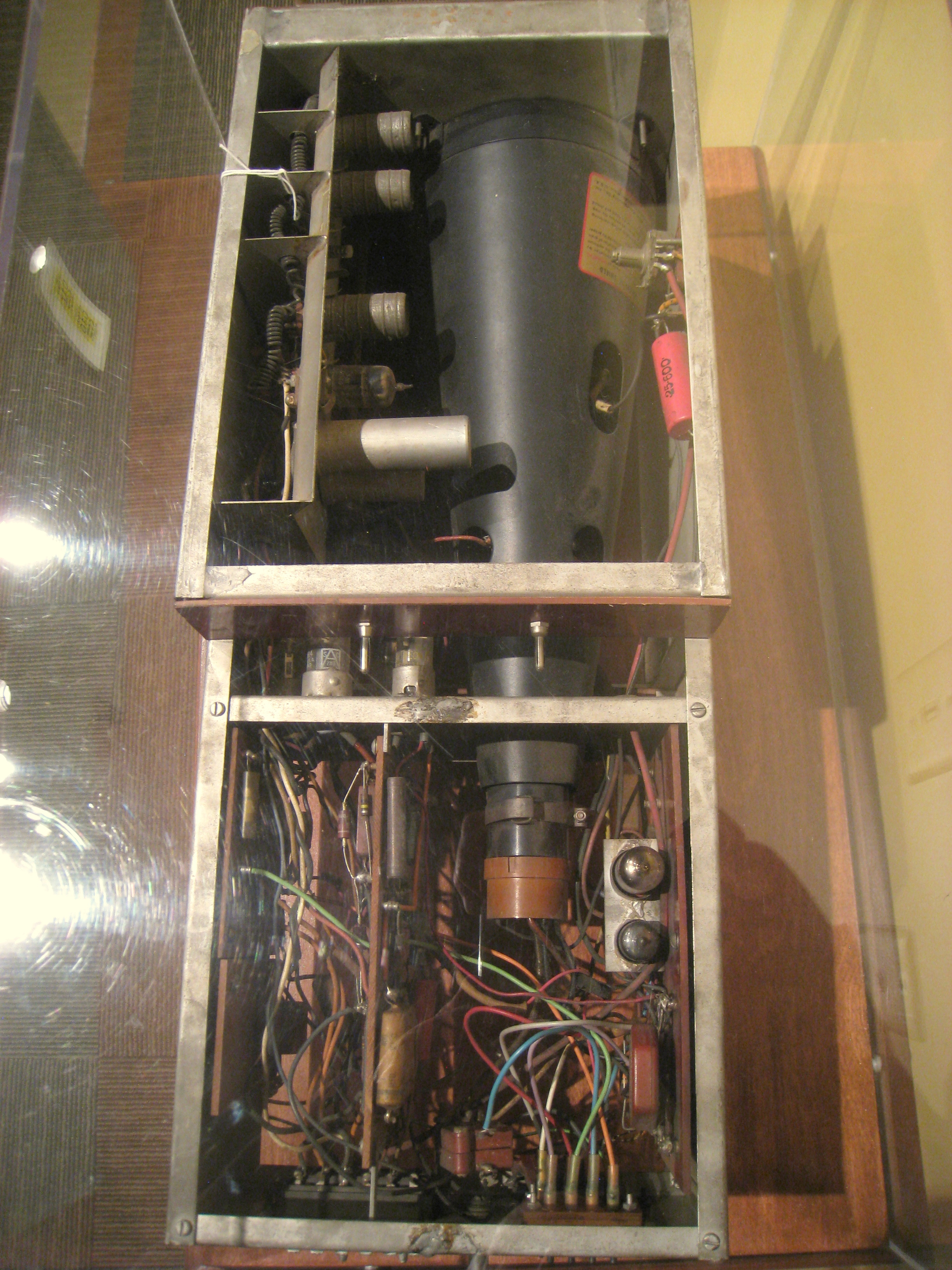
SWAC Williams tube assembly

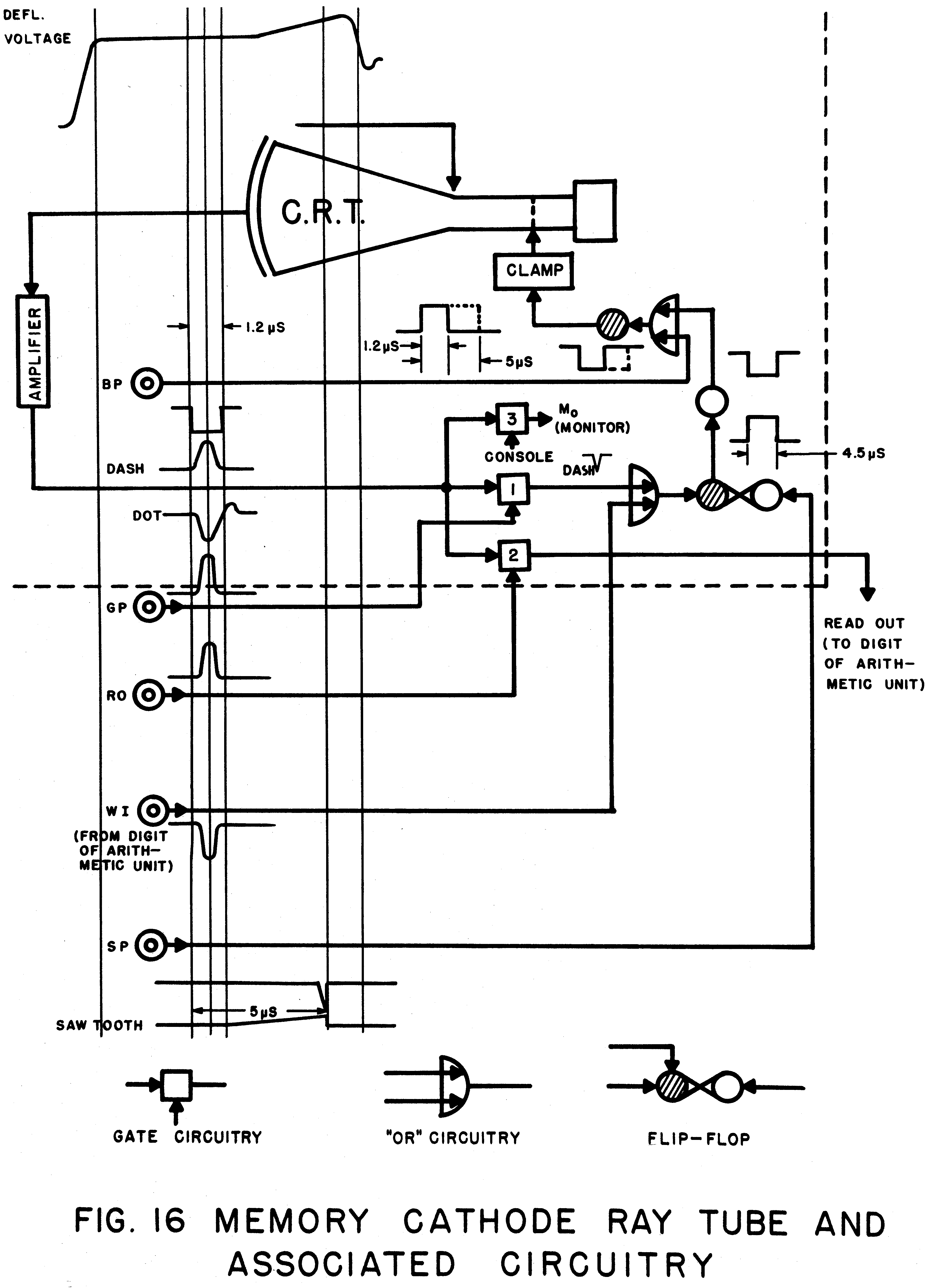
Diagram of SWAC Williams tube module

== See also ==
- Atanasoff–Berry computer – Used a type of memory called regenerative capacitor memory
- Mellon optical memory
