= Ferranti Mark 1 =

First commercial electronic computer

- Ferranti Mark 1 Star, c. 1953
- Also known as: Manchester Electronic Computer; Manchester Ferranti
- Product family: Manchester computers
- Predecessor: Manchester Mark 1

The Ferranti Mark 1, also known as the Manchester Electronic Computer in its sales literature, and thus sometimes called the Manchester Ferranti, was produced by British electrical engineering firm Ferranti Ltd. It was the world's first commercially available electronic general-purpose stored-program digital computer. (Note: Several cheaper general purpose computers were available by 1952. See Pentagon symposium: Commercially Available General Purpose Electronic Digital Computers of Moderate Price, Washington, D.C., 14 MAY 1952)

Although preceded as a commercial digital computer by the BINAC and the Z4, the Z4 was electromechanical and lacked software programmability, while BINAC never operated successfully after delivery.

The Ferranti Mark 1 was "the tidied up and commercialised version of the Manchester Mark I". The first machine was delivered to the Victoria University of Manchester in February 1951 (publicly demonstrated in July) ahead of the UNIVAC I which was delivered to the United States Census Bureau on 14 June 1951, having been sold on 31 March 1951.

== History and specifications ==
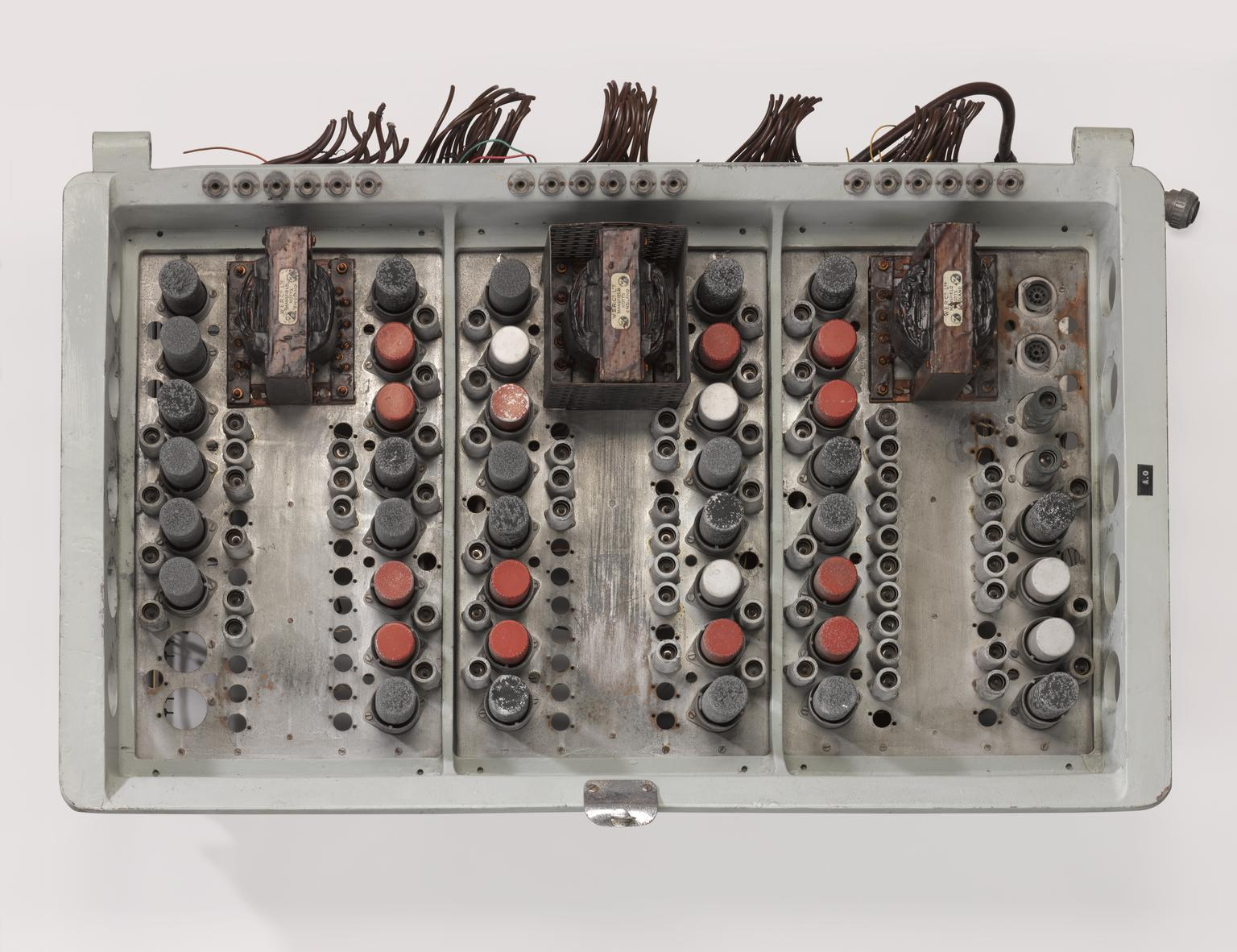
Ferranti Mark 1 components

Based on the Manchester Mark 1, which was designed at the University of Manchester by Freddie Williams and Tom Kilburn, the machine was built by Ferranti of the United Kingdom. The main improvements over it were in the size of the primary and secondary storage, a faster multiplier, and additional instructions. Assembly of the computer began in the autumn of 1950 and lasted six months.

The Mark 1 used a 20-bit word stored as a single line of dots of electric charges settled on the surface of a Williams tube display, each cathodic tube storing 64 lines of dots. Instructions were stored in a single word, while numbers were stored in two words. The main memory consisted of eight tubes, each storing one such page of 64 words. Other tubes stored the single 80-bit accumulator (A), the 40-bit "multiplicand/quotient register" (MQ) and eight "B-lines", or index registers, which was one of the unique features of the Mark 1 design. The accumulator could also be addressed as two 40-bit words. An extra 20-bit word per tube stored an offset value into the secondary storage. Secondary storage was provided in the form of a 512-page magnetic drum, storing two pages per track, with about 30 milliseconds revolution time. The drum provided eight times the storage of the original designed at Manchester.

The instructions, like the Manchester machine, used a single-address format in which operands were modified and left in the accumulator. There were about fifty instructions in total. The basic cycle time was 1.2 milliseconds, and a multiplication could be completed in the new parallel unit in about 2.16 milliseconds (about 5 times faster than the original). The multiplier used almost a quarter of the machine's 4,050 vacuum tubes. Several instructions were included to copy a word of memory from one of the Williams tubes to a paper tape machine, or read them back in. Several new instructions were added to the original Manchester design, including a random number instruction and several new instructions using the B-lines.

The original Mark 1 had to be programmed by entering alphanumeric characters representing a five-bit value that could be represented on the paper tape input. The engineers decided to use the simplest mapping between the paper holes and the binary digits they represented, but the mapping between the holes and the physical keyboard was never meant to be a binary mapping. As a result, the characters representing the values from 0–31 (five-bit numbers) looked entirely random, specifically /E@A:SIU½DRJNFCKTZLWHYPQOBG"MXV£.

The first machine was delivered to the University of Manchester. Ferranti had high hopes for further sales, and were encouraged by an order placed by the Atomic Energy Research Establishment for delivery in autumn 1952. However, a change of government while the second machine was being built led to all government contracts over £100,000 being cancelled, leaving Ferranti with a partially completed Mark 1. The company ultimately sold it to the University of Toronto, who had been building their own machine, but saw the chance to buy the complete Mark 1 for even less. They purchased it for around $30,000, a "fire sale" price, and Beatrice Worsley gave it the nickname FERUT. FERUT was extensively used in business, engineering, and academia, among other duties, carrying out calculations as part of the construction of the St. Lawrence Seaway.

Alan Turing wrote a programming manual.

== Mark 1 Star ==
After the first two machines, a revised version of the design became available, known as the Ferranti Mark 1 Star or the Ferranti Mark 1*. The revisions mainly cleaned up the instruction set for better usability. Instead of the original mapping from holes to binary digits that resulted in the random-looking mapping, the new machines mapped digits to holes to produce a much simpler mapping, ø£½0@:$ABCDEFGHIJKLMNPQRSTUVWXYZ. Additionally, several commands that used the index registers had side effects that led to quirky programming, but these were modified to have no side effects. The original machines' JUMP instructions landed at a location "one before" the actual address, for reasons similar to the odd index behaviour, but these proved useful only in theory and quite annoying in practice, and were similarly modified. Input/output was also modified, with five-bit numbers being output least significant digit to the right, as is typical for most numeric writing. These, among other changes, greatly improved the ease of programming the newer machines.

The Mark 1/1* weighed 10,000 pounds (5.0 short tons; 4.5 t).

At least seven of the Mark 1* machines were delivered between 1953 and 1957, one of them to Shell labs in Amsterdam. Another was installed at Avro, the aircraft manufacturers, at their Chadderton factory in Manchester. This was used for work on the Vulcan among other projects.

Conway Berners-Lee and Mary Lee Woods, the parents of Tim Berners-Lee, inventor of the World Wide Web, both worked on the Ferranti Mark 1 and Mark 1*.

== Computer music ==
Included in the Ferranti Mark 1's instruction set was a hoot command, which enabled the machine to give auditory feedback to its operators. The sound generated could be altered in pitch, a feature which was exploited when the Mark 1 made the earliest known recording of computer-generated music, playing a medley which included "God Save the King", "Baa Baa Black Sheep", and "In the Mood". The recording was made by the BBC towards the end of 1951, with the programming being done by Christopher Strachey, a mathematics teacher at Harrow and a friend of Alan Turing. It was not, however, the first computer to have played music; CSIRAC, Australia's first digital computer, achieved that with a rendition of "Colonel Bogey".

== Computer games ==
In November 1951, Dietrich Prinz wrote one of the earliest computer games, a chess-playing program for the Manchester Ferranti Mark 1 computer. The limitation of the Mark 1 computer did not allow for a whole game of chess to be programmed. Prinz could only program mate-in-two chess problems. The program examined every possible move for White and Black (thousands of possible moves) until a solution was found, which took 15–20 minutes for easy problems but several hours in general. The program's restrictions were: no castling, no double pawn move, no en passant capture, no pawn promotion, nevertheless it could distinguish between checkmate and stalemate.

== See also ==
- History of computing hardware
- List of vacuum-tube computers
- Manchester computers
- Dietrich Prinz's Chess Program
