= Pulse computation =

Pulse computation is a hybrid of digital and analog computation that uses aperiodic electrical spikes, as opposed to the periodic voltages in a digital computer or the continuously varying voltages in an analog computer. Pulse streams are unclocked, so they can arrive at arbitrary times and can be generated by analog processes, although each spike is allocated a binary value, as it would be in a digital computer.

Pulse computation is primarily studied as part of the field of neural networks. The processing unit in such a network is called a "neuron".
