= Overlay keyboard =

End-user customizable keyboard without a pre-set layout

An overlay keyboard or concept keyboard is a specialized keyboard with no preset keys. Each key can be programmed with a wide range of different functions. Overlay keyboards are often used as a quick and easy way to input items with just two buttons.

Overlay keyboards generally consist of a flat grid of unmarked buttons. A sheet called an overlay is placed on the keyboard to identify each key, after the keyboard is programmed. The overlay can consist of any combination of words, symbols, or pictures.

== Advantages ==
Overlay keyboards have several advantages over conventional keyboards or mice. They do not require memorization of shortcut keys (i.e. F5, Alt+S, etc.) nor do they require a great deal of fine motor control, making them ideal for people who have difficulty using a conventional keyboard. Overlay keyboards are easy to clean, and resistant to spills or dust. The ability to change overlay sheets also makes it easy for a single overlay keyboard to have several different uses.

== Usage ==
Overlay keyboards are probably most often found in fast food restaurants, where they reduce the amount of time required to enter items. Overlay keyboards are also used in education, especially at the primary level. They can also be used by disabled people who have sensory or motor control difficulties.
