= DYSEAC =

1954 transportable computer

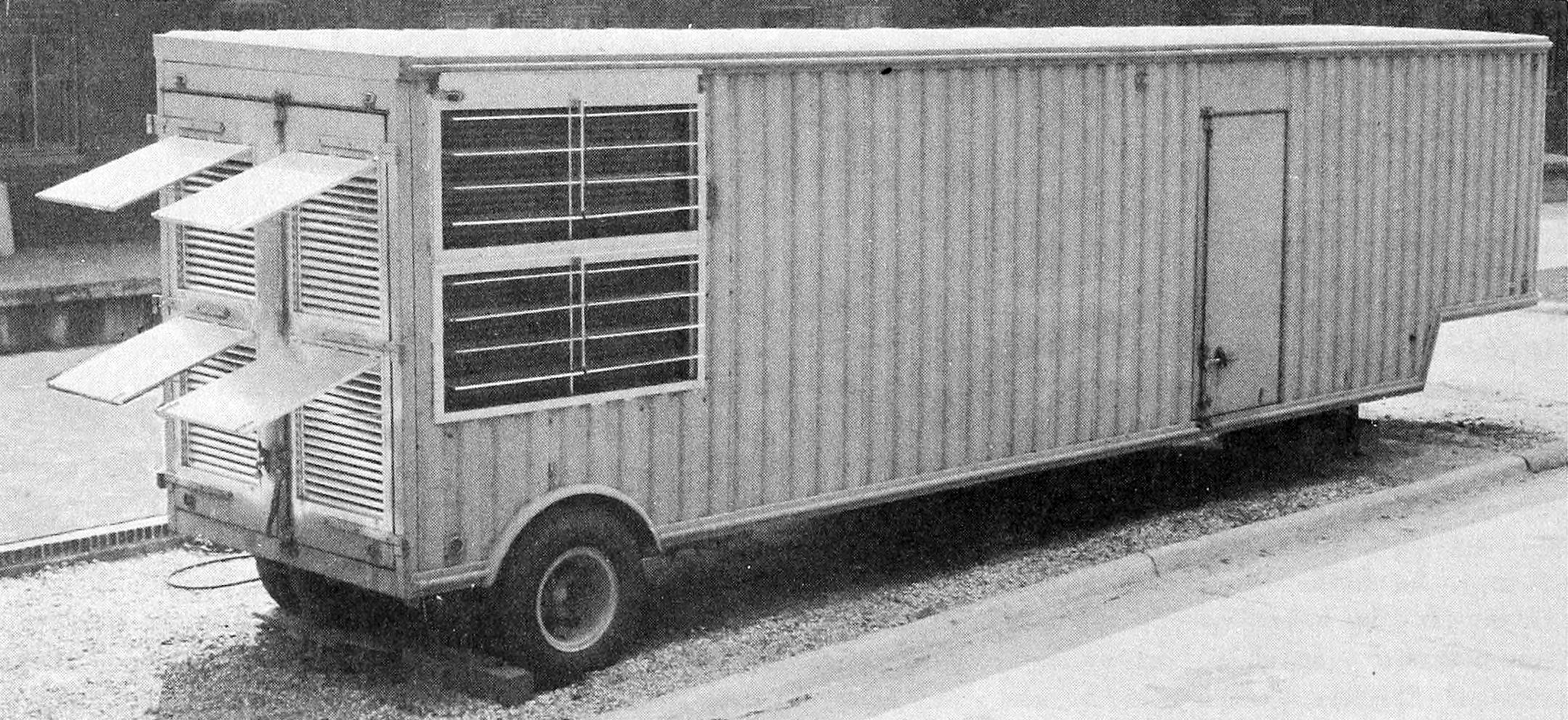
- DYSEAC van No. 1
- Manufacturer: National Bureau of Standards for the U.S. Army Signal Corps
- Generation: 1
- Released: April 1954; 72 years ago
- CPU: 900 vacuum tubes and 24,500 crystal diodes
- Memory: 512 words of 45 bits each (plus 1 parity bit) (mercury delay-line memory)
- Weight: 20 short tons (18 t)
- Predecessor: SEAC

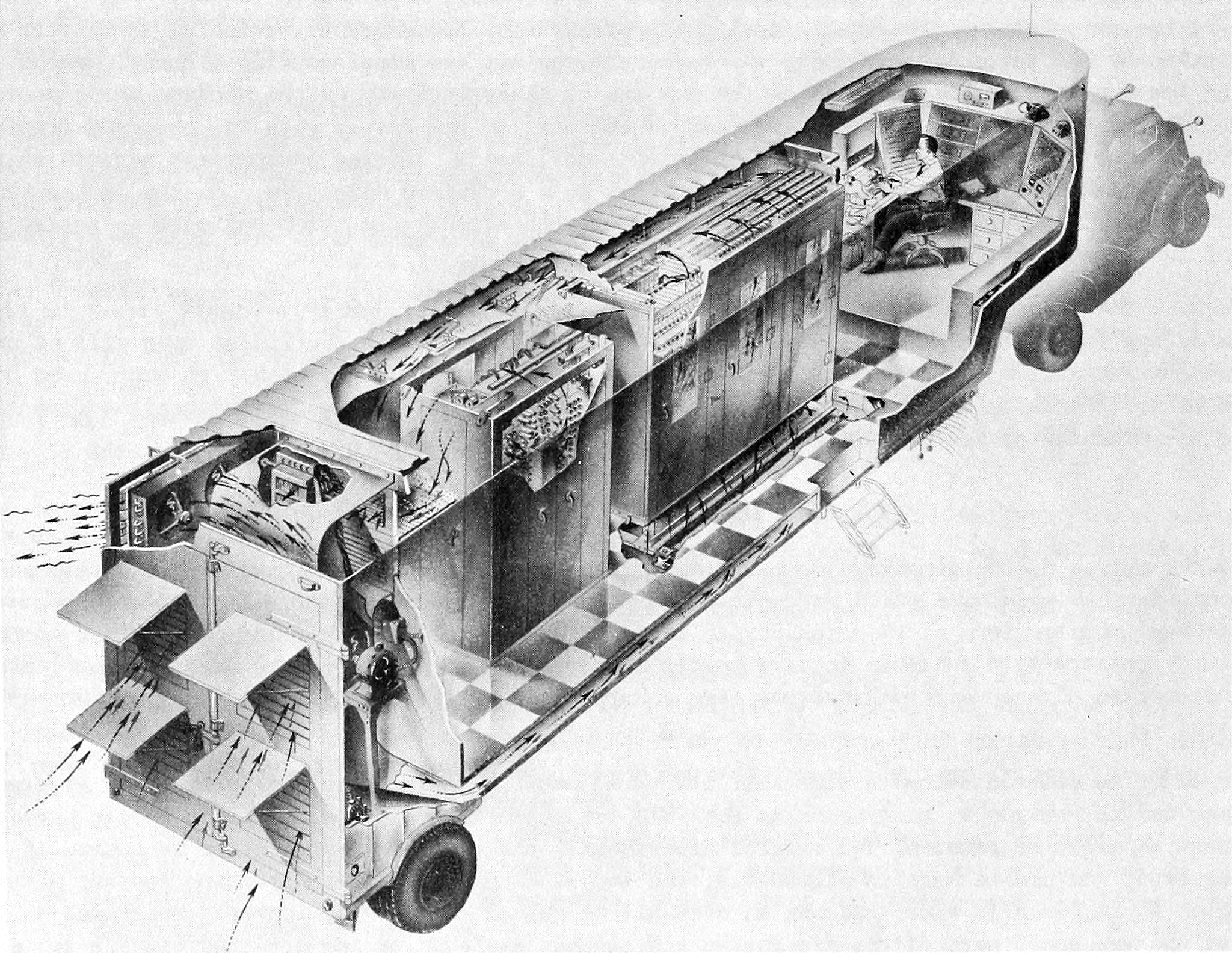
Cross-sectional diagram of a DYSEAC van

DYSEAC was the second Standards Electronic Automatic Computer. (See SEAC.)

DYSEAC was a first-generation computer built by the National Bureau of Standards for the U.S. Army Signal Corps. It was housed in a truck, making it one of the first movable computers (perhaps the first). It went into operation in April 1954.

DYSEAC used 900 vacuum tubes and 24,500 crystal diodes. It had a memory of 512 words of 45 bits each (plus one parity bit), using mercury delay-line memory. Memory access time was 48–384 microseconds. The addition time was 48 microseconds, and the multiplication/division time was 2112 microseconds. These times are excluding the memory-access time, which added up to approximately 1500 microseconds to those times.

DYSEAC may have been the first computer to implement interrupts for I/O.

DYSEAC weighed about 20 US tons (18 metric tons).

== See also ==
- SEAC
- List of vacuum-tube computers
