= Ralph J. Slutz =

American physicist and computer architect

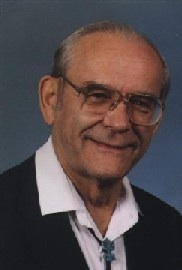
- Ralph J. Slutz
- Born: May 18, 1917; Cleveland, Ohio, USA
- Died: November 16, 2005 (aged 88); Boulder, Colorado, USA
- Education: Massachusetts Institute of Technology (B.S. and M.S.); Princeton University (Ph.D.)
- Known for: SEAC, ICOADS
- Scientific career
- Fields: Physics, Computer Science
- Workplaces: Institute for Advanced Study, Princeton, New Jersey; National Bureau of Standards (NIST today); University of Colorado Boulder
- Doctoral advisor: Howard P. Robertson
- Notable students: Xiaodong Zhang

Ralph J. Slutz was an American physicist and computer architect known for his work in the Electronic Computer Project at the Institute of Advanced Study (IAS) and as a co-inventor of the SEAC. He was also a pioneer of the comprehensive ocean-atmosphere datasets for the International Comprehensive Ocean-Atmosphere Data Set (ICOADS) project.

== Biography ==
Ralph Jeffery Slutz was born on May 18, 1917, in Cleveland, Ohio.

He received a Bachelor of Science in electrical engineering in 1938 and a Master of Science in 1939 from the Massachusetts Institute of Technology (MIT). Later, Dr. Slutz received his PhD in theoretical physics from the Princeton University in 1946.

Dr. Slutz was associated with the Electronic Computer Project working with John von Neumann at the Institute of Advanced Study (IAS) following his PhD in 1946. In 1948, he joined the National Bureau of Standards (now NIST), where he co-invented the SEAC computer with Samuel N. Alexander and worked as its chief architect until 1954. Dr. Slutz then served as the chief of the Radio Propagation Physics Division at the National Bureau of Standards in Boulder, Colorado, until 1980.

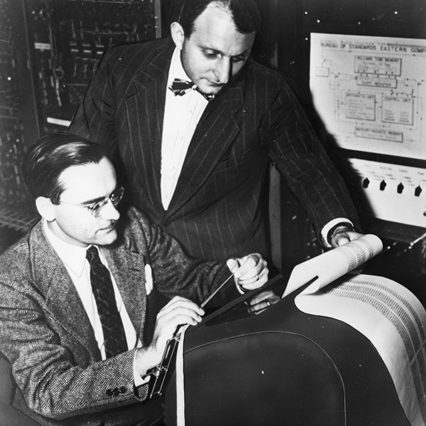
Ralph J. Slutz and Samuel Alexander worked on the SEAC Computer together in 1950.

After retiring from the National Bureau of Standards in 1980, he became a senior scientist at the Cooperative Institute for Research in Environmental Sciences (CIRES) at the University of Colorado at Boulder, where he led the ICOADS project until 1989. In 1987, Dr. Slutz co-authored and published the first research paper of ICOADS, titled A Comprehensive Ocean-Atmosphere Data Set. This first released dataset comprised seventy million marine datasets collected between 1854 and 1986. Since then, the datasets of ICOADS have been extended to the late 20th and early 21st centuries.

Dr. Slutz died on November 16, 2005, in Boulder, Colorado. In 2010, The Ralph J. Slutz Student Excellence Award was established in the Computer Science Department at the University of Colorado at Boulder in his honor.

== Personal life ==
Ralph Jeffery Slutz married Margaret Mary Mitchell (1919–2011) in 1946. Margaret and Ralph had 4 children, 15 grandchildren, and by 2025, 14 great grandchildren.

== Representative publications ==
- Memories of the Bureau of Standards’ SEAC, in Book of A History of Computing in the Twentieth Century, Academic Press, R. J. Slutz, 1980
- A Comprehensive Ocean-Atmosphere Data Set, in Bulletin of the American Meteorological Society, S. D. Woodruff, R. J. Slutz, R. L. Jenne, P. M. Steurer, 1987.
