= Dattorro industry scheme =

Delay-based audio effects system

Dattorro block diagram

The Dattorro industry scheme is a digital system used to implement a wide range of delay-based audio effects for digital signals. It was proposed by Jon Dattorro. The common nature of these effects allows to produce an output signal as the linear combination of (dynamically modulated) delayed replicas of the input signal. The proposed scheme allows to implement such effects in a compact form, only using a set of three parameters to control the type of effect.

The Dattorro industry scheme is based on digital delay lines and to ensure a proper resolution in the time domain, it leverages fractional delay lines, thus avoiding discontinuities.

The effects that this scheme is able to produce are: echo, chorus, vibrato, flanger, doubling, white chorus. These effects are characterized by a nominal delay, a modulating function for the delay and the depth of modulation.

== Delay line interpolation ==
Consider continuous time signal $y(t)$. The $\tau$-delayed version of such signal is $y(t) = x(t-\tau)$. Considering the signal in the discrete time domain (i.e., sampling it with sampling frequency $F_s$ at $n = tF_s$), we obtain $y[n] = x[n-M]$. The delay line can then be described in terms of the Z-transform of the discrete time signal as

$Y(z) = \mathcal Z \{y \}(n) = z^{-M}X(z) = H_M(z) X(z)$.

When going back in the time domain exploiting the inverse Z-transform, this corresponds to $h_m[n] = \delta[n-M]$, where $\delta[\cdot]$ is the Dirac delta. The former equation holds for $D\in\mathbb N$ but for the implementation we need a fractional delay, meaning $D =\lfloor D\rfloor + (D-\lfloor D\rfloor) = M+d,\quad d\in\mathbb R, \ 0<d<1$. In this case, interpolation is required to reconstruct the value of the signal that lies between two samples. One can resort to the preferred interpolation technique, e.g., Lagrange interpolation, or all-pass interpolation.

Linear interpolator block diagram

All-pass interpolator block diagram

== Block diagram ==
The output of the delay block $H_{M}(z) = z^{-M}$ is noted above and below as rarely it is taken from the last sample of the tap but instead it changes dynamically. Considering the end to end structure, we can write the filter as:

Dattorro scheme

$$Y(z)  = H(z)X(z) = \frac{b+f_f z^{-D (t) } } {1+z^{-D(t)} f_b }X(z)$$

Setting the coefficients according to the desired effect results in a change of the filter topology. For example, setting the feedback to 0 results in a FIR filter, whereas, if the coefficients are set to be equal, we approximate an all-pass filter.

Guitar string $E_2$ sound

Echo

Vibrato

Flanger

Doubling

Chorus effect

White chorus

== Effects ==
All the effects can be obtained by changing the parameters of the Dattorro system and by setting the delay ranges according to the following table. Delay values are expressed in milliseconds.

Effect	Onset	Nominal	Range End
Vibrato	0	Minimal	5
Flange	0	1	10
Chorus	1	5	30
Doubling	10	20	100
Echo	50	80	$\infty$

=== Vibrato ===
Vibrato is a small quasi-periodic change in pitch of a tone. It's more of a technique than an effect per se but can be added to any audio signal. The delay is modulated with a low frequency sinusoidal function and no mix of the direct path of the signal is considered.

=== Chorus ===
The chorus is an effect which tries to emulate multiple independent voices playing in unison. This effect is made as a linear combination of the input signal (dry signal) and a dynamically delayed version of the input (wet signal).

=== Flanging ===
The flanging effect originated with tape machines. This effect was created by mixing two tape machines set to play the same track but one of them is slowed down. This produces a lowering in pitch and a delay of the slow track. The process is then repeated with the other track reabsorbing the accumulated delay. This effect is very similar to chorus and the main difference is due to the delay range. Chorus usually has longer delay, larger depth and lower modulating frequency.

=== White chorus ===
White chorus is a modification to the standard chorus effect aimed at reducing the aberrations introduced by the forward path. The change consists in adding a negative feedback path with a different and fixed tap point in order to obtain an approximation of an all-pass configuration.

=== Doubling ===
When the system is used without feedback we achieve doubling. This effect is analogous to that of the Leslie speaker, a particular kind of speaker consisting of a rotating chamber in front of the bass loudspeaker and rotating cones above the treble loudspeakers .

== Knob settings ==
Effect	Blend $b$	Feedforward $f_f$	Feedback $f_b$	Modulation type D(t)
Vibrato	0.0	1.0	0.0	sinusoid
Flanger	0.7071	0.7071	$-$0.7071	sinusoid
White chorus	0.7071	1.0	0.7071	low pass noise
Chorus	1.0	0.7071	0.0	low pass noise
Doubling	0.7071	0.7071	0.0	low pass noise
Echo	1.0	$\ll$1.0	<1.0	none

== Pseudocode ==
The filter can be implemented in software or hardware. In the following is the pseudocode for a software Dattorro system.

function dattorro is
    input: x,                                   # input signal
           Fs,                                  # sampling frequency
           depth,                               # modulation depth
           freq,                                # LFO frequency
           b,                                   # blend knob
           ff,                                  # feedforward knob
           fb,                                  # feedback knob
           mod                                  # modulation type
    output: y                                   # signal with FX applied

    depth_samples = depth·Fs                    # compute delay in samples
    if mod is sinusoid                          # compute delay sequence
        delay_seq = depth_samples*(1 + sin(2·
  
    
      
        π
      
    
    {\displaystyle \pi }
  
·freq*t))
    else mod is noise
        lowpass_noise = noise_gen()             # generate white noise and low-pass filter it
        delay_seq = depth_samples + depth_samples·lowpass_noise
    
    for each n of the N samples

        d_int = floor(delay_seq(n))             # integer delay
        d_frac = delay_seq(n) - d_int           # fractional delay        
        h0 = (d_frac - 1)·(d_frac - 2)/2        # first FIR filter coefficient
        h1 = d_frac·(2 - d_frac)                # second FIR filter coefficient
        h2 = d_frac/2·(d_frac - 1)              # third FIR filter coefficient
        
        x_d = delay_line(d_int + 1)·h0 + delay_line(d_int + 2)·h1 + delay_line(d_int + 3)·h2  # delay input                                       
        
        f_b = fb·x_d                            # delayed input feedback
        delay_line(2:L) = delay_line(1:L-1)     # delay line update
        delay_line(1) = x(i) - fb_comp
        
        f_f = ff·x_d                            # feedforward component
        blend_comp = b·delay_line(1)            # blend component

        y(n) = ff_comp + blend_comp             # compute output sample
  
    return y

== See also ==
- Digital delay line
- Effects unit
- Filter design
