= International Comprehensive Ocean-Atmosphere Data Set =

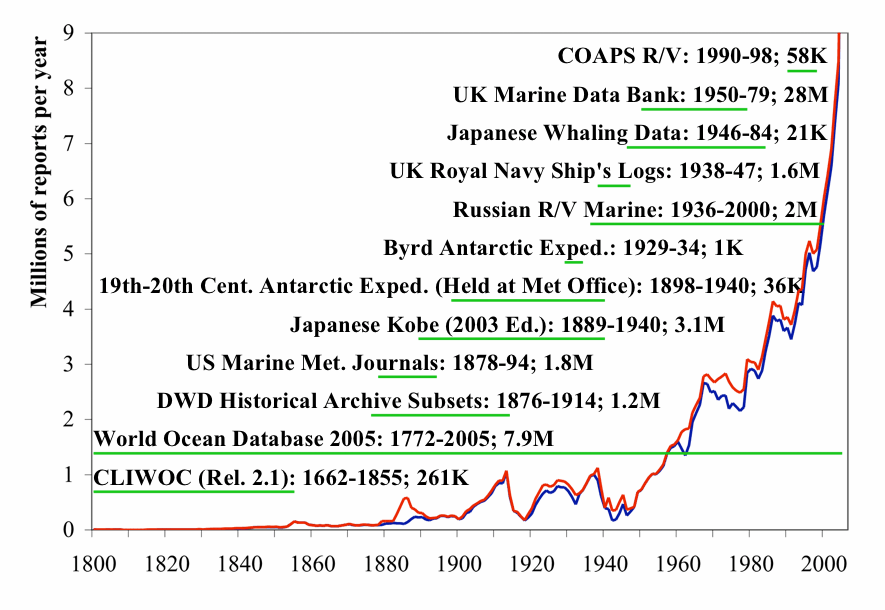
Number of observations available per year within ICOADS

The International Comprehensive Ocean-Atmosphere Data Set (ICOADS) is a digital database of 261 million weather observations made by ships, weather ships, and weather buoys spanning the years 1662 to 2007. The database was initially constructed in 1985 and continues to be expanded upon and updated on a regular basis. From the original data, gridded datasets were created. ICOADS information has been useful in determining the reliability of ship and buoy wind measurements, helping to determine temperature trends in the sea surface temperature field, and updating the Atlantic hurricane database.

== History ==
Beginning in 1981, the Comprehensive Ocean-Atmosphere data set (COADS) began construction within the United States. In April 1985, the first version of this database was created, including 70 million reports covering the years of 1854 through 1979. The first COADS paper, titled "A Comprehensive Ocean-Atmosphere Data Set", was published in 1987 in the Bulletin of the American Meteorological Society. It was co-authored by Scott D. Woodruff, Ralph J. Slutz, Roy L. Jenne, and Peter M. Steurer. Each year thereafter, recent data was added to the dataset to extend its length towards the present. In November 1996, the first gridded datasets were created, using a one degree latitude by one degree longitude grid for the years 1960 through 1993. The following November, they were revised and extended to cover years through 1995. In November 1999, they were extended into 1997. In March 2002, two degree grids were created on a monthly basis for the years 1800 through 1949, and in recognition of input from other countries such as the United Kingdom and Germany, the database was renamed ICOADS. In November 2000, the database was extended backward to 1784. In September 2002, this data became available through the internet. In late 2005, data from weather buoys were added into the database. In July 2009, the database was extended back to 1662. Data updates to include recent observations were begun on a monthly basis. Following format changes to BUFR on the World Meteorological Organization Global Telecommunications System (GTS) in recent years, ICOADS began decoding near-real-time BUFR observations and merging them with Traditional Alphanumeric Code (TAC) formats for a new near-real-time version in 2022. The total number of observations in the database is now 261 million.

== Available information ==
ICOADS has a variety of marine meteorological information within it, such as air temperature, sea surface temperature, wind, pressure, humidity, and cloudiness. Data in the time frame from 1662 through the early 1800s in quite sparse, as ship voyages covered only small areas of the globe in those days.

== Related research ==
Based upon data from ICOADS, wind reports from moored weather buoys were determined to have smaller error than those from ships. The use of winds and pressures from ocean observations within ICOADS has led to a refinement of the Atlantic hurricane database as part of the North Atlantic hurricane reanalysis. Sea surface temperature data from ICOADS have been used to detect 20th century trends within that field. Global atmospheric reanalyses of past years have utilized the data within ICOADS.

== See also ==
- Atmospheric Circulation Reconstructions over the Earth
