= Samuel N. Alexander =

American computer scientist

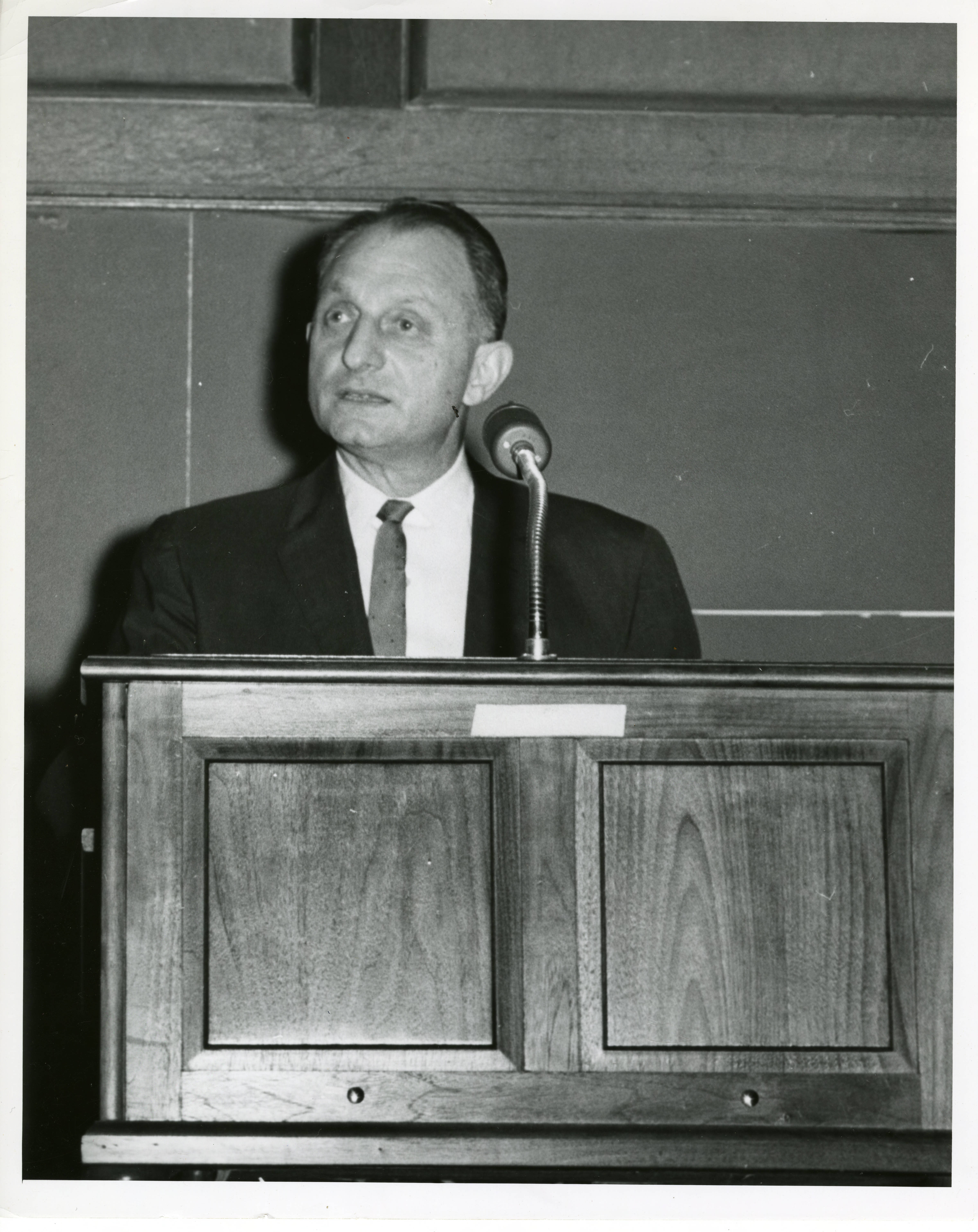
Samuel N. Alexander in 1964, speaking at the SEAC computer retirement ceremony.

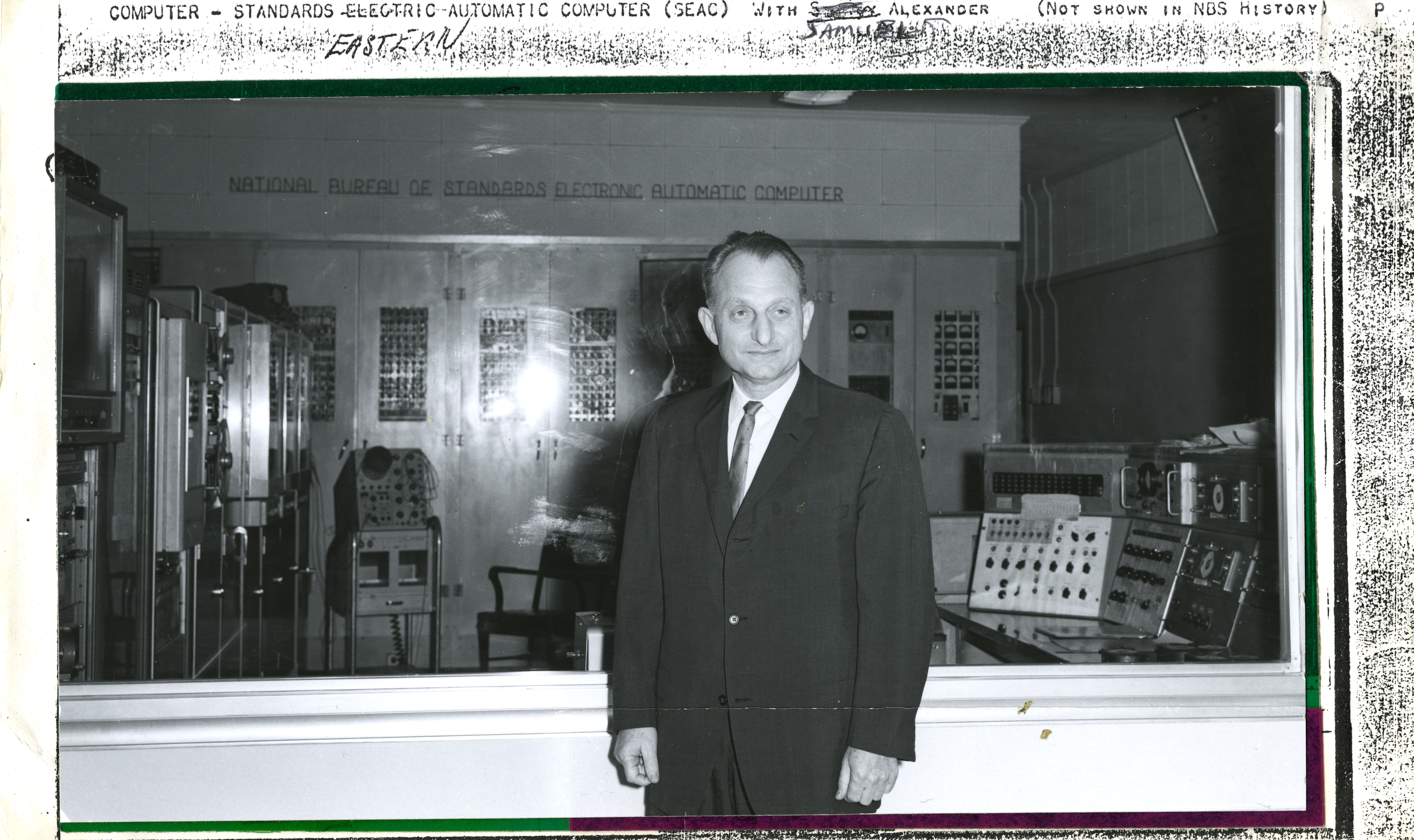
Samuel N. Alexander with SEAC

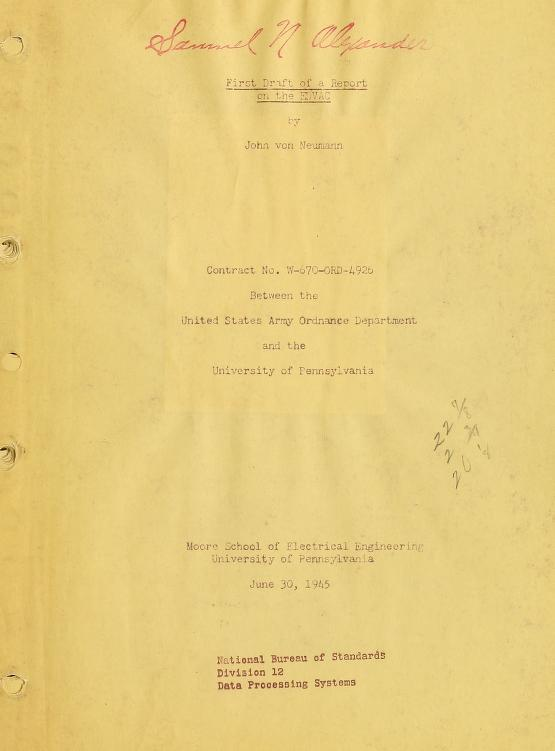
Title page of the First Draft of a Report on the EDVAC with Alexander's signature.

Samuel Nathan Alexander (February 22, 1910 in Wharton, Texas – December 9, 1967 in Chevy Chase, Maryland) was an American computer pioneer who developed SEAC, one of the earliest computers.

== Career ==
Alexander studied at the University of Oklahoma, earning a bachelor's degree in 1931 and at the Massachusetts Institute of Technology with a master's degree in 1933. After that, he was an engineer in the laboratory of Simplex, Wire and Cable Company, worked in the electronic instrument development for the U.S. Navy and was Senior Project Engineer at the Bendix Aviation Corporation. In 1946 he went to the National Bureau of Standards, where he became head of the Laboratory of electronic computer until 1954, when he became head of the data processing department. From 1964 to his death in 1967 he headed the Department of Information Technology. Alexander assisted Margaret R. Fox in developing a series of college computer courses beginning in 1966.

At the National Bureau of Standards in Washington, he developed the SEAC computer (Standards Eastern Automatic Computer). At first this was named National Bureau of Standards (NBS) Interim Computer. It was one of many computers built at that time along the lines of John von Neumann's design in universities, laboratories and government organizations, but were only intended as an interim solution until the industry could provide better computers. In this case, they were waiting for a computer by UNIVAC (Alexander was also involved in its design), whose delivery had been delayed. Alexander's chief architect was Ralph J. Slutz (1917–2005) who previously worked with John von Neumann to build a computer at the Institute for Advanced Study.

The SEAC was the first fully functional electronic computer with internal program memory (stored program) in the U.S. it also was the first computer with semiconductor logic (first 10,500, then 16,000 germanium diodes), in addition to the 747 and later 1600 vacuum tubes. The computer operated for 14 years and was originally intended for training purposes within government agencies, but some of the earliest assemblers and compilers were built for it. It was the fastest fully functional computer for about a year until the UNIVAC I came out in 1951. It also served as a model for other government computers e.g. with the National Security Agency.

Alexander also initiated the prototype DYSEAC at the NBS, a successor to the SEAC, which was built for the US Signal Corps. It was delivered in 1954 and could be transported in a truck.

He was an advisor to the US government and, in 1956 to Sweden and, in 1957, India.

In 1967 he received the Harry H. Goode Memorial Award and the 1981 Computer Pioneer Award from the IEEE Computer Society. He was a member of the Washington Academy of Sciences.
