= Analog delay line =

Electronic device

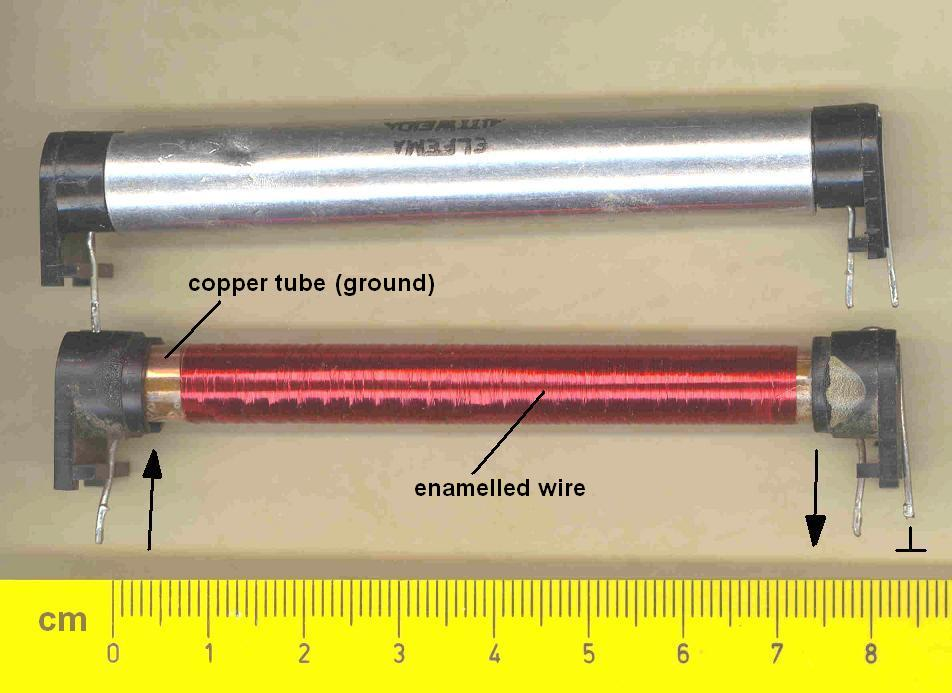
Electric delay line (450 ns) from a color TV-set. Made of enamelled copper wire, wound in one layer around a copper tube and forming a distributed inductor-capacitor network.

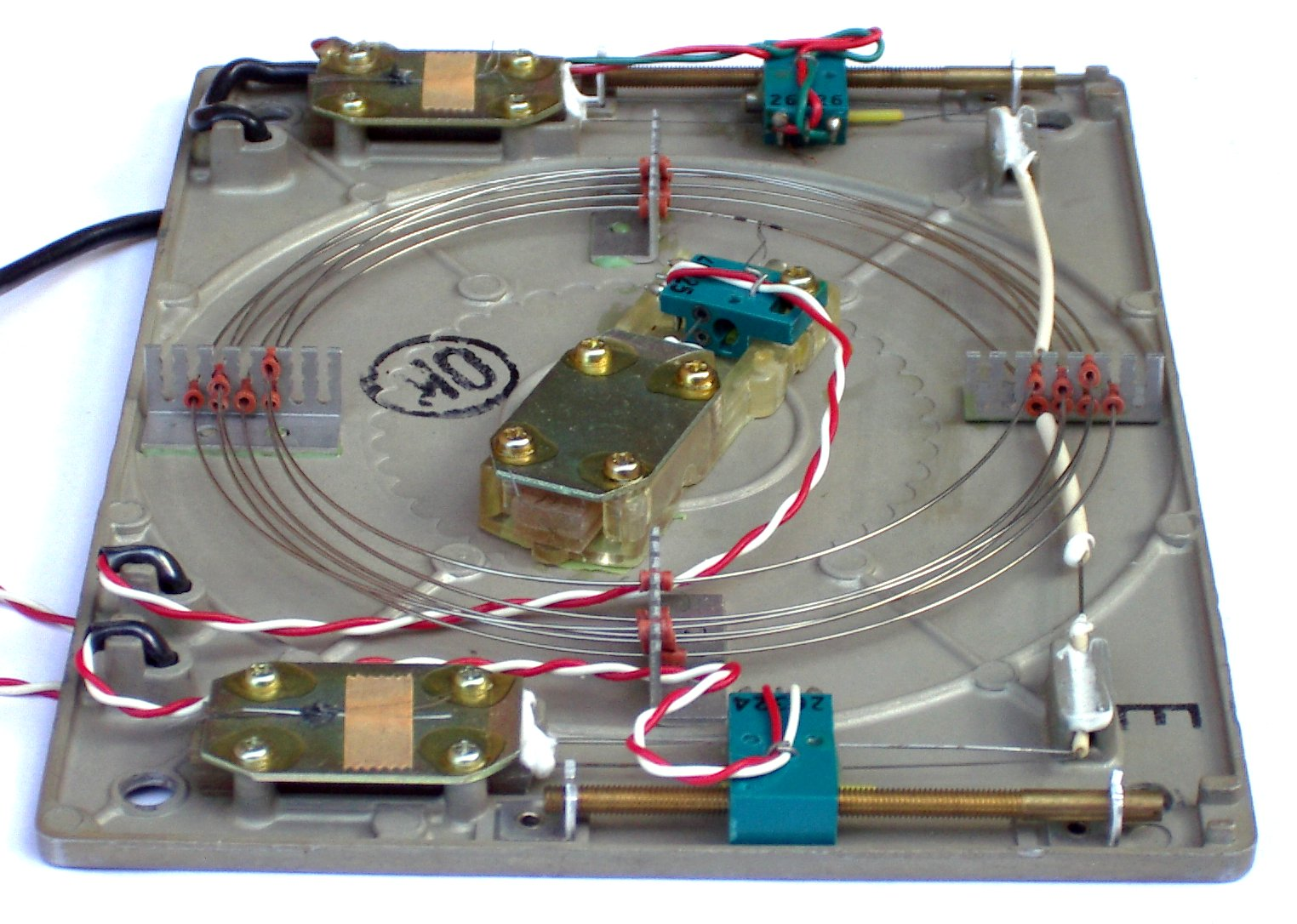
A magnetostrictive torsion wire delay line

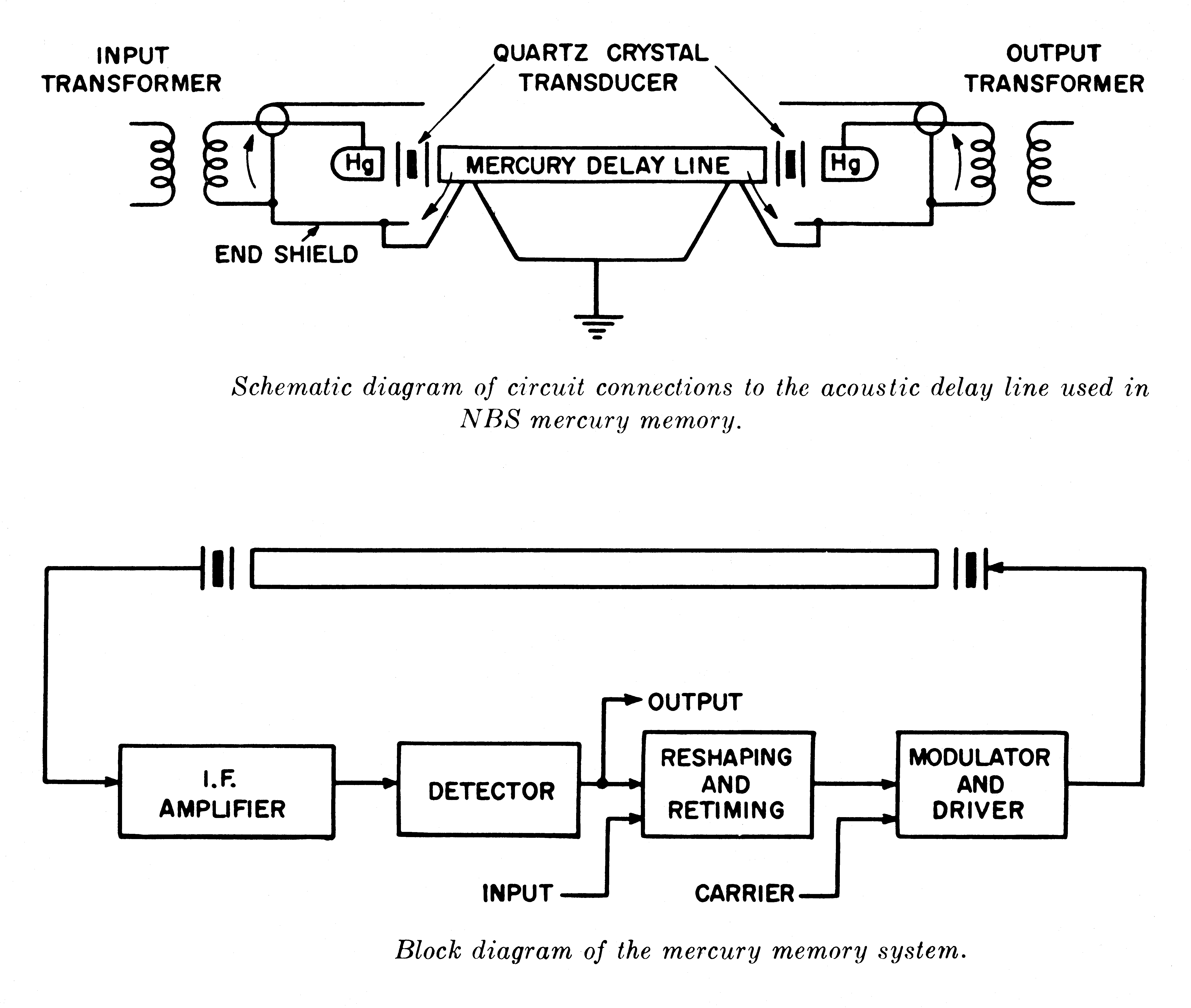
Schematic of circuit connections to the acoustic delay line used in NBS mercury memory (top); block diagram of the mercury memory system (bottom)

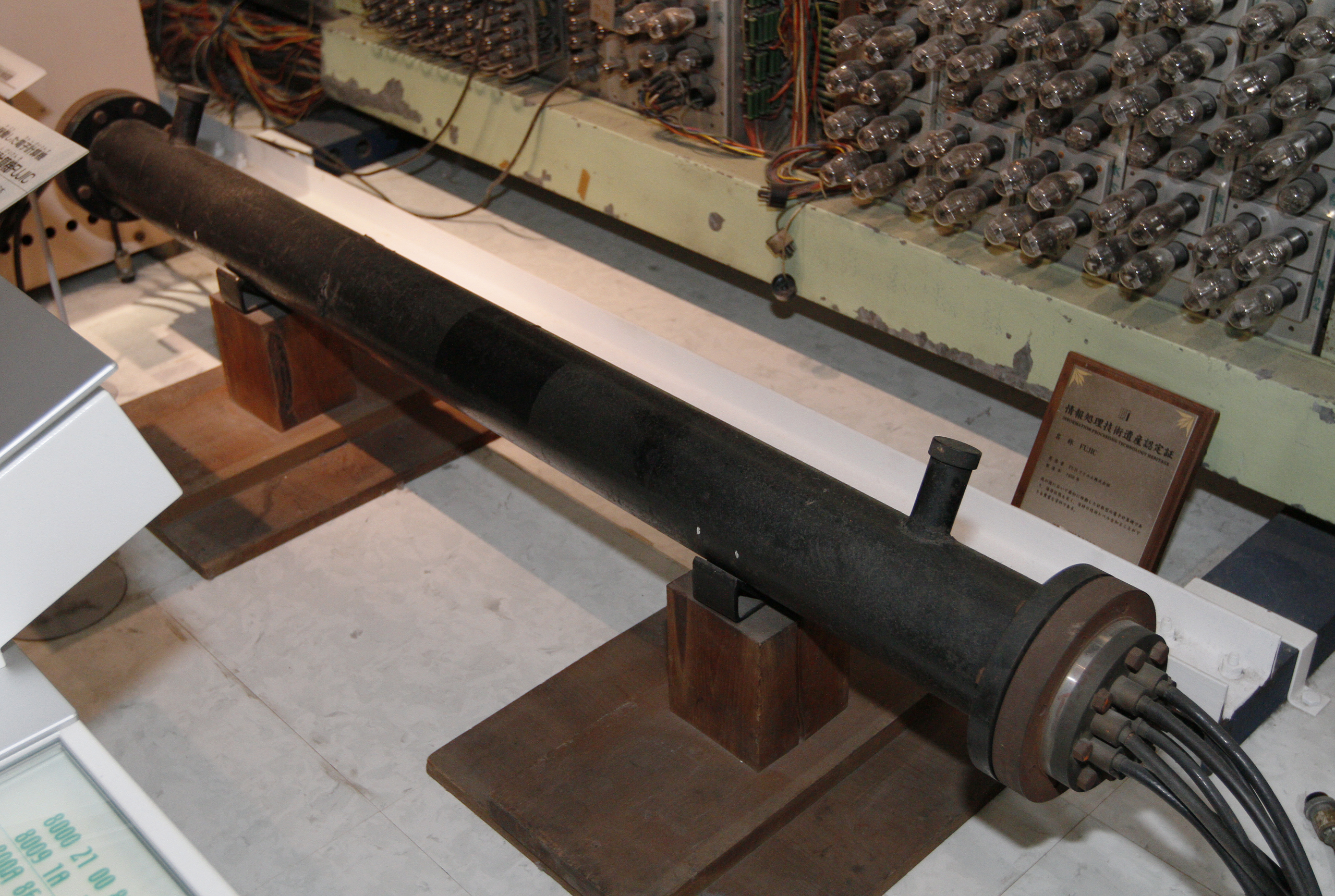
FUJIC's ultrasonic mercury delay line memory (capacity: 255 words = 8,415 bits)

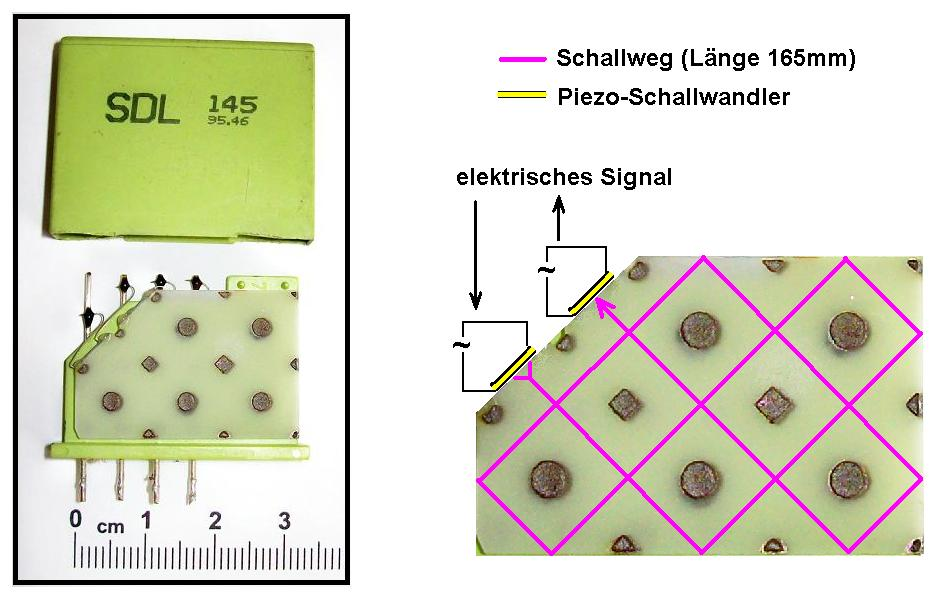
Ultrasonic delay line from a PAL color TV (delay time 64 μs), showing path of sound waves (pink) and transducers (yellow, upper left)

An analog delay line is a network of electrical components connected in cascade, where each individual element creates a time difference between its input and output. It operates on analog signals whose amplitude varies continuously. In the case of a periodic signal, the time difference can be described in terms of a change in the phase of the signal. One example of an analog delay line is a bucket-brigade device.

Other types of delay line include acoustic (usually ultrasonic), magnetostrictive, and surface acoustic wave devices. A series of resistor–capacitor circuits (RC circuits) can be cascaded to form a delay. A long transmission line can also provide a delay element. The delay time of an analog delay line may be only a few nanoseconds or several milliseconds, limited by the practical size of the physical medium used to delay the signal and the propagation speed of impulses in the medium.

Analog delay lines are applied in many types of signal processing circuits; for example the PAL television standard uses an analog delay line to store an entire video scanline. Acoustic and electromechanical delay lines are used to provide a "reverberation" effect in musical instrument amplifiers, or to simulate an echo. High-speed oscilloscopes used an analog delay line to allow observation of waveforms just before some triggering event. Radar systems used liquid delay lines to compare one pulse of radio to another, and after World War II these were used as computer memory systems.

With the growing use of digital signal processing techniques, digital forms of delay are practical and eliminate some of the problems with dissipation and noise in analog systems.

== History ==
Inductor–capacitor ladder networks were used as analog delay lines in the 1920s. For example, Francis Hubbard's sonar direction finder patent filed in 1921. Hubbard referred to this as an Artificial transmission line. In 1941, Gerald Tawney of Sperry Gyroscope Company filed for a patent on a compact packaging of an inductor–capacitor ladder network that he explicitly referred to as a time delay line.

In 1924, Robert Mathes of Bell Telephone Laboratories filed a broad patent covering essentially all electromechanical delay lines, but focusing on acoustic delay lines where an air column confined to a pipe served as the mechanical medium, and a telephone receiver at one end and a telephone transmitter at the other end served as the electromechanical transducers. Mathes was motivated by the problem of echo suppression on long-distance telephone lines, and his patent clearly explained the fundamental relationship between inductor–capacitor ladder networks and mechanical elastic delay lines such as his acoustic line.

In 1938, William Spencer Percival of Electrical & Musical Industries (later EMI) applied for a patent on an acoustical delay line using piezoelectric transducers and a liquid medium. He used water or kerosene, with a 10 MHz carrier frequency, with multiple baffles and reflectors in the delay tank to create a long acoustic path in a relatively small tank.

In 1939, Laurens Hammond applied electromechanical delay lines to the problem of creating artificial reverberation for his Hammond organ. Hammond used coil springs to transmit mechanical waves between voice-coil transducers.

The problem of suppressing multipath interference in television reception motivated Clarence Hansell of RCA to use delay lines in his 1939 patent application. He used "delay cables" for this, relatively short pieces of coaxial cable used as delay lines, but he recognized the possibility of using magnetostrictive or piezoelectric delay lines.

By 1943, compact delay lines with distributed capacitance and inductance were devised. Typical early designs involved winding an enamel insulated wire on an insulating core and then surrounding that with a grounded conductive jacket. Richard Nelson of General Electric filed a patent for such a line that year. Other GE employees, John Rubel and Roy Troell, concluded that the insulated wire could be wound around a conducting core to achieve the same effect. Much of the development of delay lines during World War II was motivated by the problems encountered in radar systems.

In 1944, Madison G. Nicholson applied for a general patent on magnetostrictive delay lines. He recommended their use for applications requiring delays or measurement of intervals in the 10 to 1000 microseconds time range.

In 1945, Gordon D. Forbes and Herbert Shapiro filed a patent for the mercury delay line with piezoelectric transducers. This delay line technology would play an important role, serving as the basis of the delay-line memory used in several first-generation computers.

In 1946, David Arenberg filed patents covering the use of piezoelectric transducers attached to single crystal solid delay lines. He tried using quartz as a delay medium and reported that anisotropy in the quartz crystals caused problems. He reported success with single crystals of lithium bromide, sodium chloride and aluminum. Arlenberg developed the idea of complex 2- and 3-dimensional folding of the acoustic path in the solid medium in order to package long delays into a compact crystal. The delay lines used to decode PAL television signals follow the outline of this patent, using quartz glass as a medium instead of a single crystal.

== See also ==
- Digital delay line
- Delay-line memory
- Propagation delay
- Charge-coupled device
