= SEAC (computer) =

First-generation electronic computer built in 1950

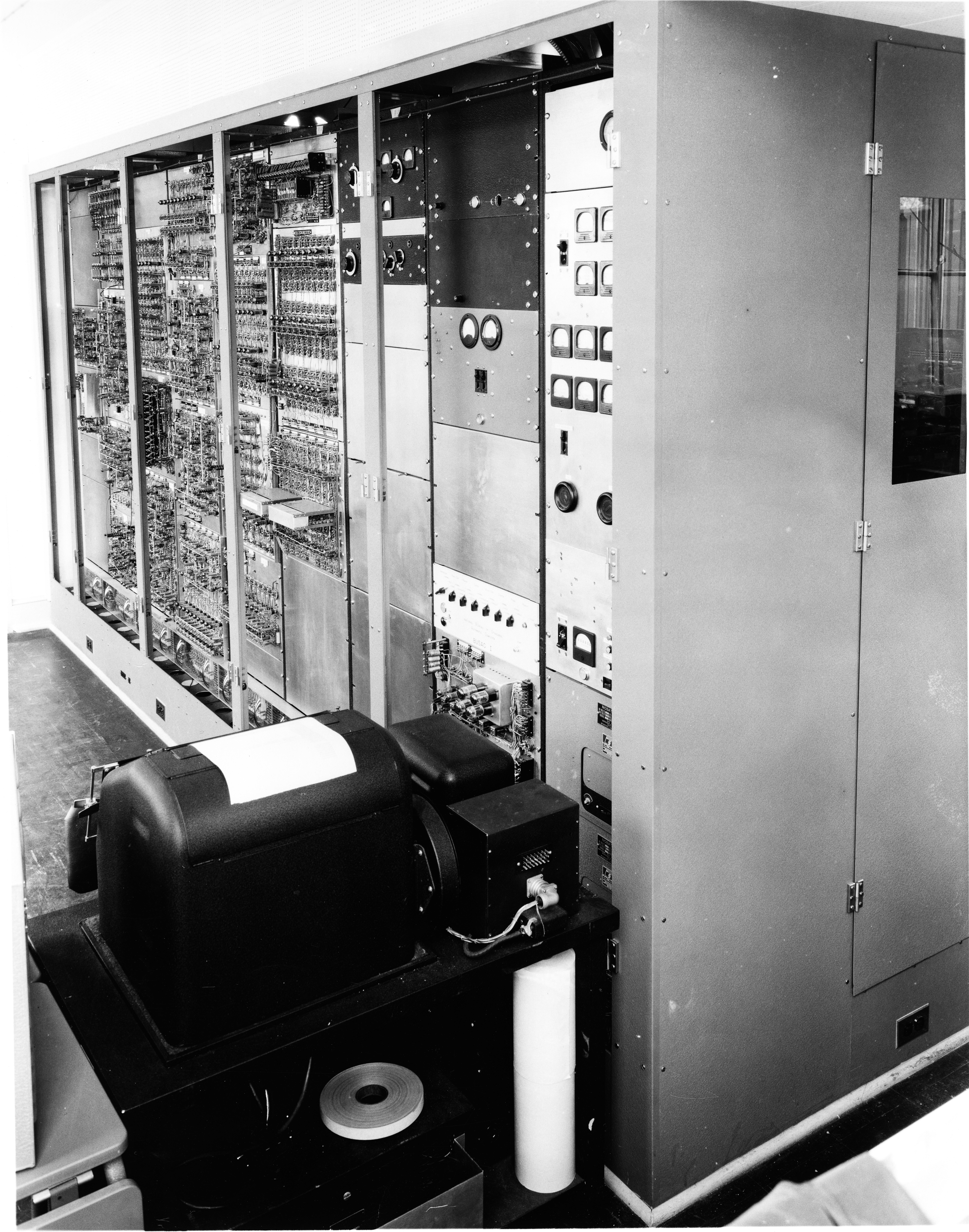
- SEAC in 1950
- Developer: Samuel N. Alexander, Ralph J. Slutz, and team
- Manufacturer: U.S. National Bureau of Standards (NBS)
- Released: 1950; 76 years ago
- Units sold: 1
- CPU: @ 1 MHz
- Memory: 512 words, with each being 45 bits in size (64 acoustic delay lines)
- Weight: 3,000 pounds (1.5 short tons; 1.4 t) (Central Machine)

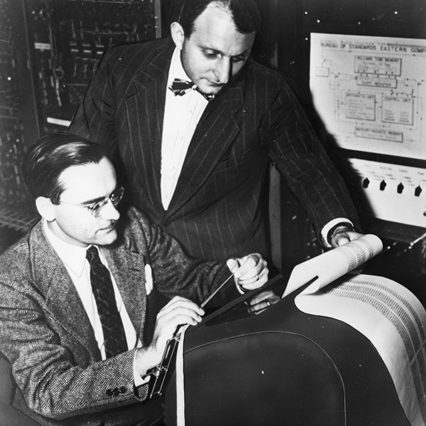
Ralph J. Slutz (right) and Samuel Alexander (left) worked on the SEAC Computer together in 1950.

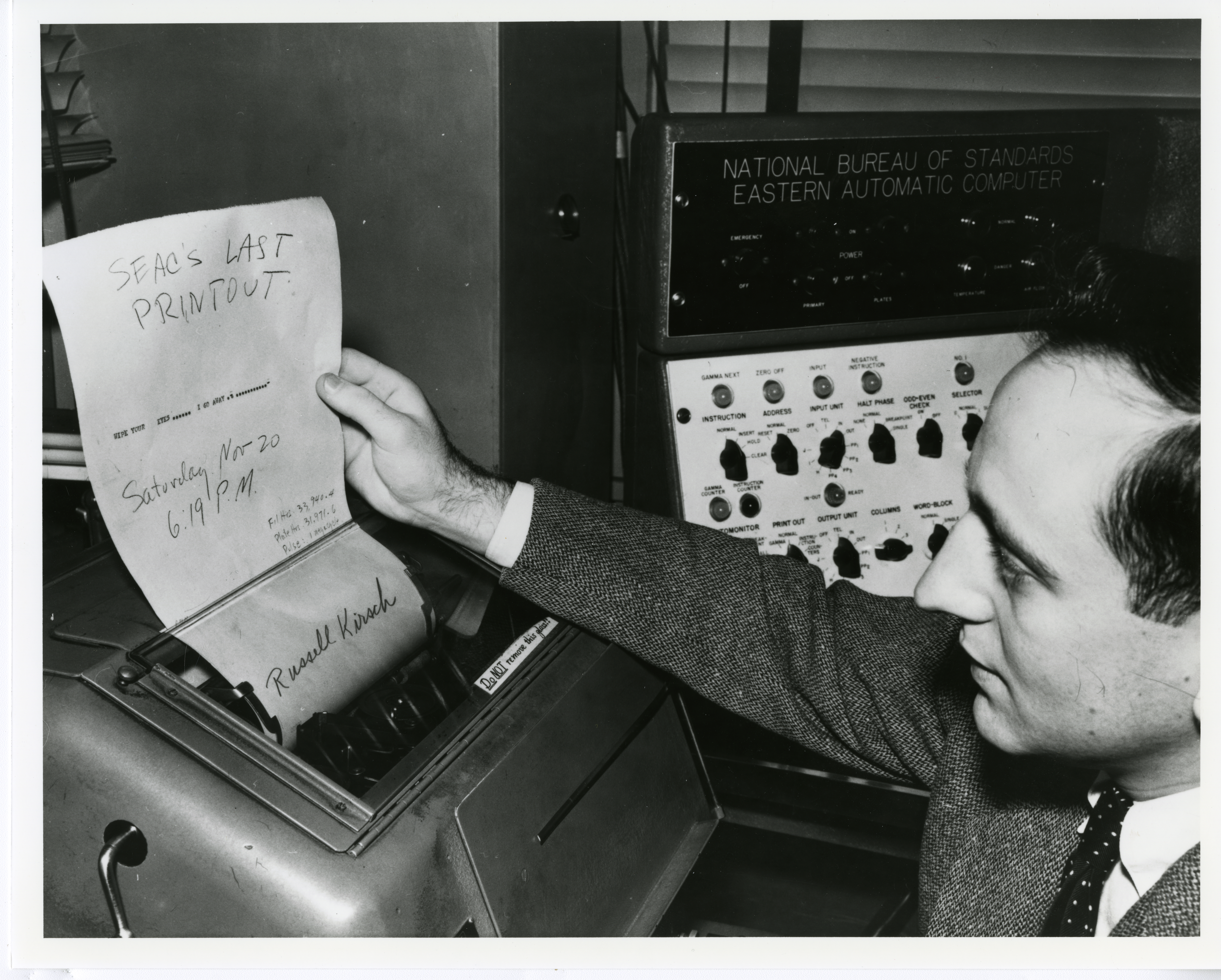
SEAC's "last printout," November 1954. However SEAC was reassembled successfully and ran for another ten years until its dismantling in 1964. Printout reads: WIPE YOUR EYE5...... I GO AWAY .%...........-

SEAC (Standards Eastern Automatic Computer or Standards Electronic Automatic Computer) was a first-generation electronic computer, built in 1950 by the U.S. National Bureau of Standards (NBS) and was initially called the National Bureau of Standards Interim Computer, because it was a small-scale computer designed to be built quickly and put into operation while the NBS waited for more powerful computers to be completed (the DYSEAC). The team that developed SEAC was led by Samuel N. Alexander and Ralph J. Slutz. SEAC was demonstrated in April 1950 and was dedicated in June 1950; it is claimed to be the first fully operational stored-program electronic computer in the US.

== Description ==
Based on EDVAC, SEAC used only 747 vacuum tubes (a small number for the time) eventually expanded to 1,500 tubes. It had 10,500 germanium diodes which performed all of the logic functions (see the article diode–transistor logic for the working principles of diode logic), later expanded to 16,000 diodes. It was the first computer to do most of its logic with solid-state devices. The tubes were used for amplification, inversion and storing information in dynamic flip-flops. The machine used 64 acoustic delay lines to store 512 words of memory, with each word being 45 bits in size. The clock rate was kept low (1 MHz).

The computer's instruction set consisted of only 11 types of instructions: fixed-point addition, subtraction, multiplication, and division; comparison, and input & output. It eventually expanded to 16 instructions.

The addition time was 864 microseconds and the multiplication time was 2,980 microseconds (i.e. close to 3 milliseconds).

It weighed 3,000 pounds (1.5 short tons; 1.4 t) (central machine).

== Applications ==
On some occasions SEAC was used by a remote teletype. This makes it one of the first computers to be used remotely. With many modifications, it was used until 1964. Some of the problems run on it dealt with:

- digital imaging, led by Russell A. Kirsch
- computer animation of the city traffic simulation
- meteorology
- linear programming
- optical lenses
- a program for Los Alamos National Laboratory
- tables for LORAN navigation
- statistical sampling plans
- wave function of the helium atom
- designing a proton synchrotron
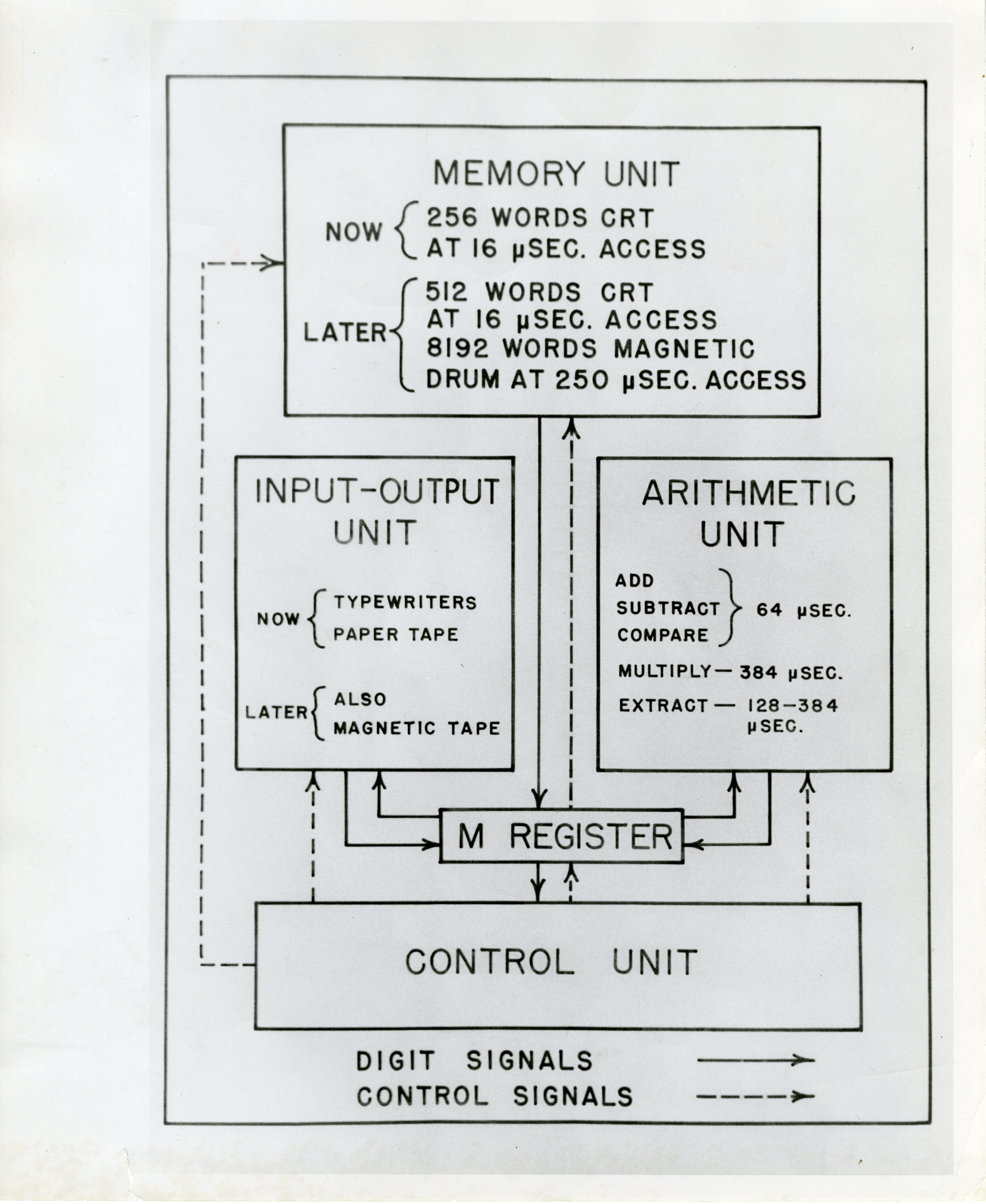
SEAC block diagram

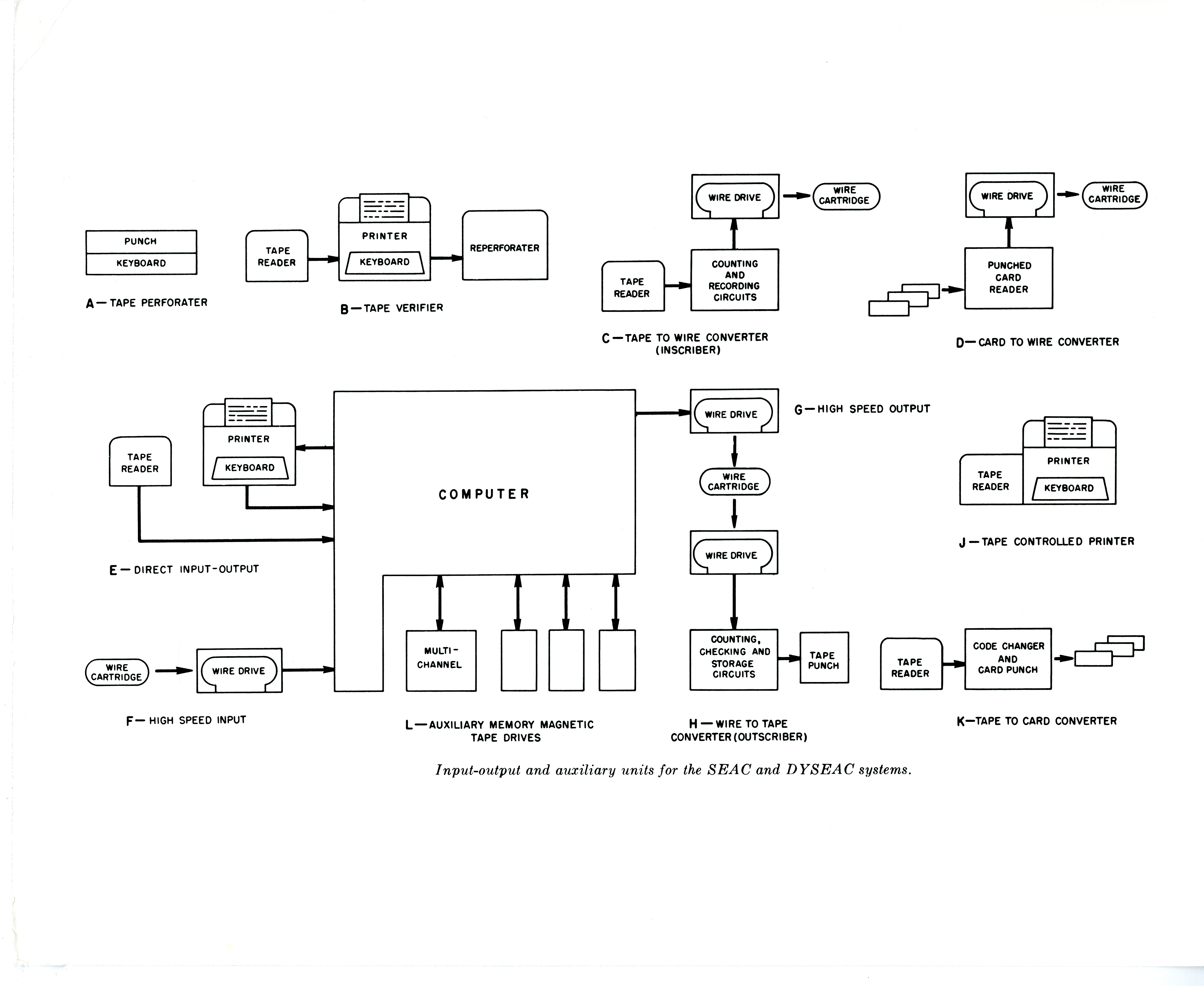
SEAC input/output diagram

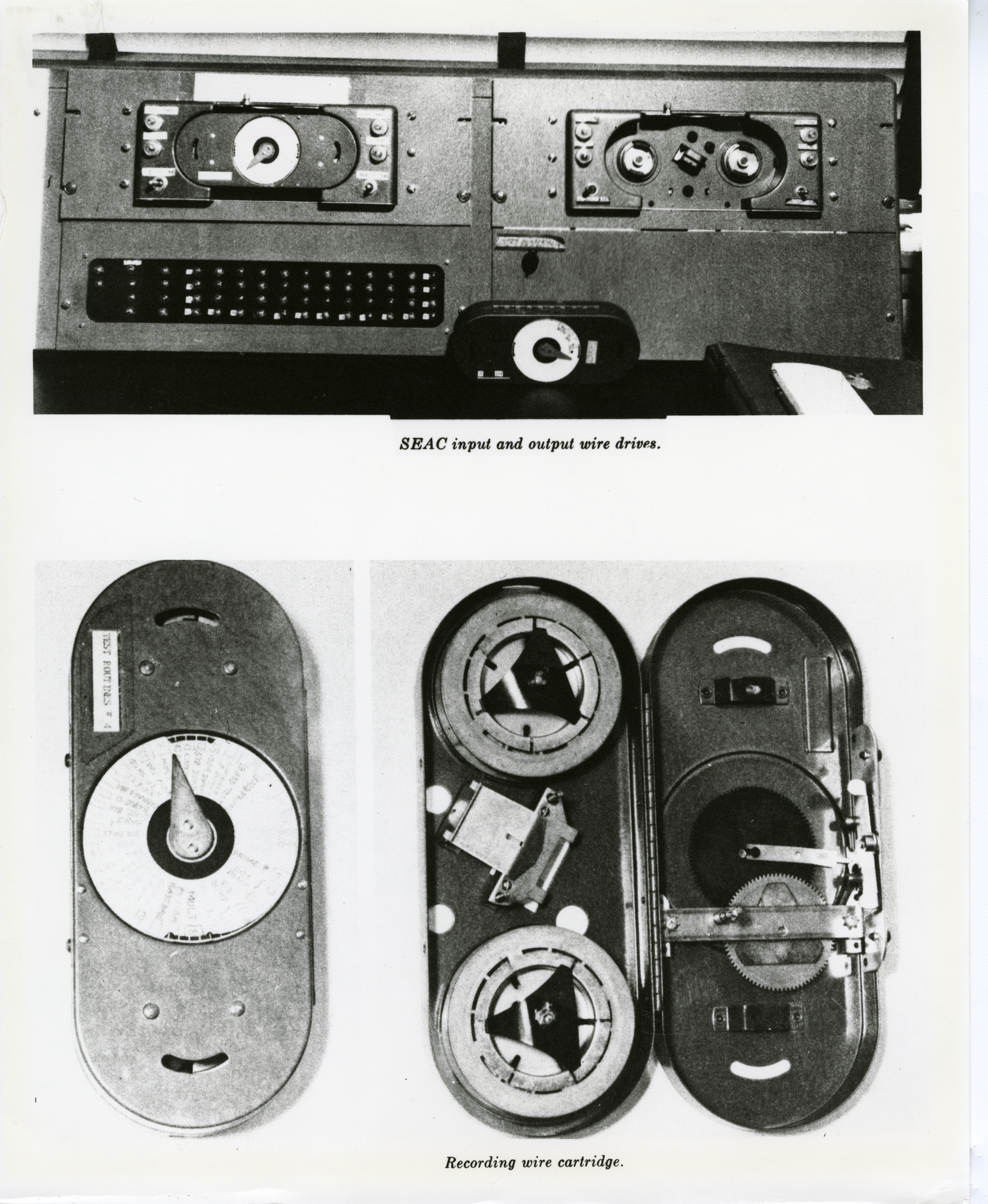
Magnetic wire drives and cartridges

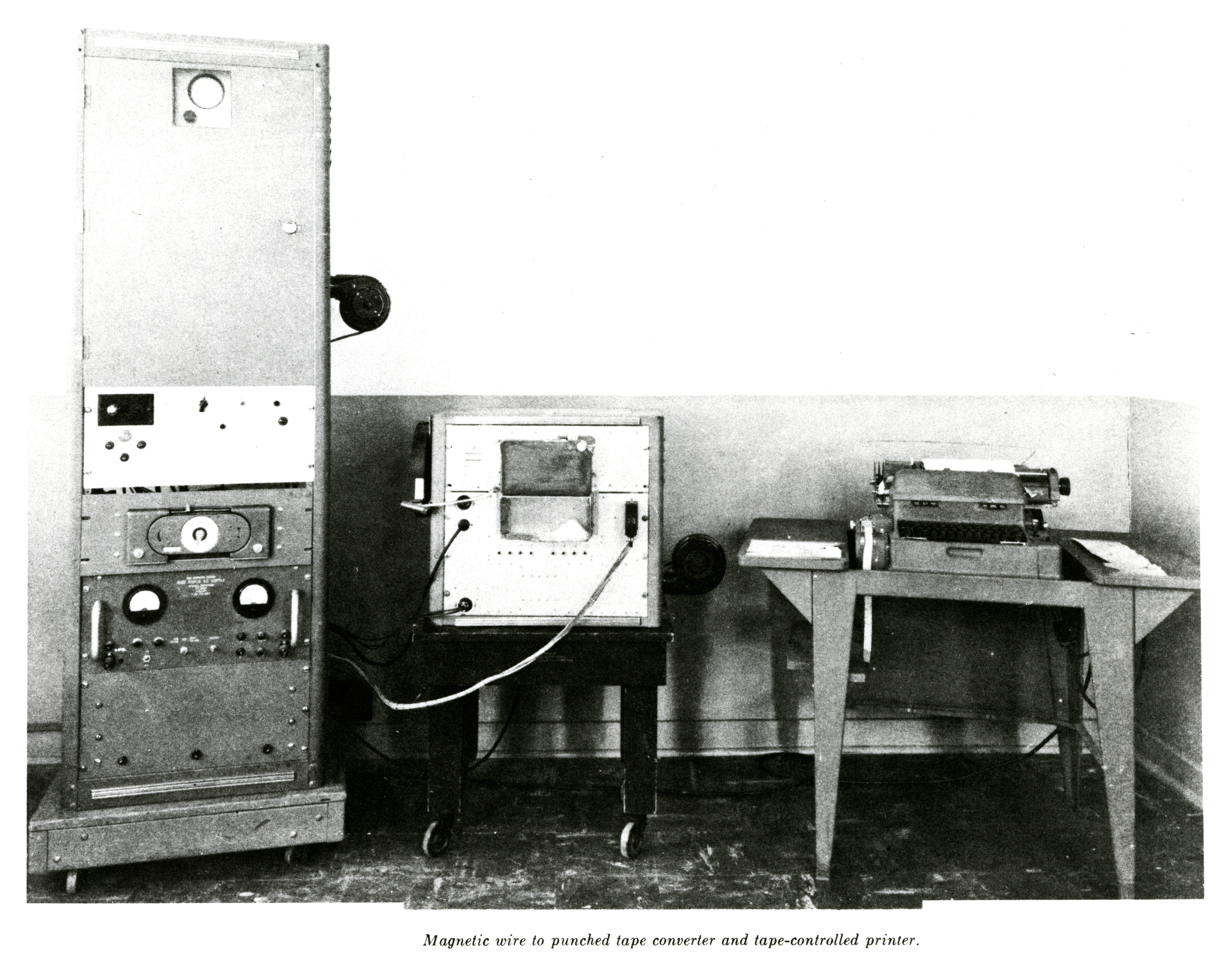
Offline magnetic wire to paper tape & print station

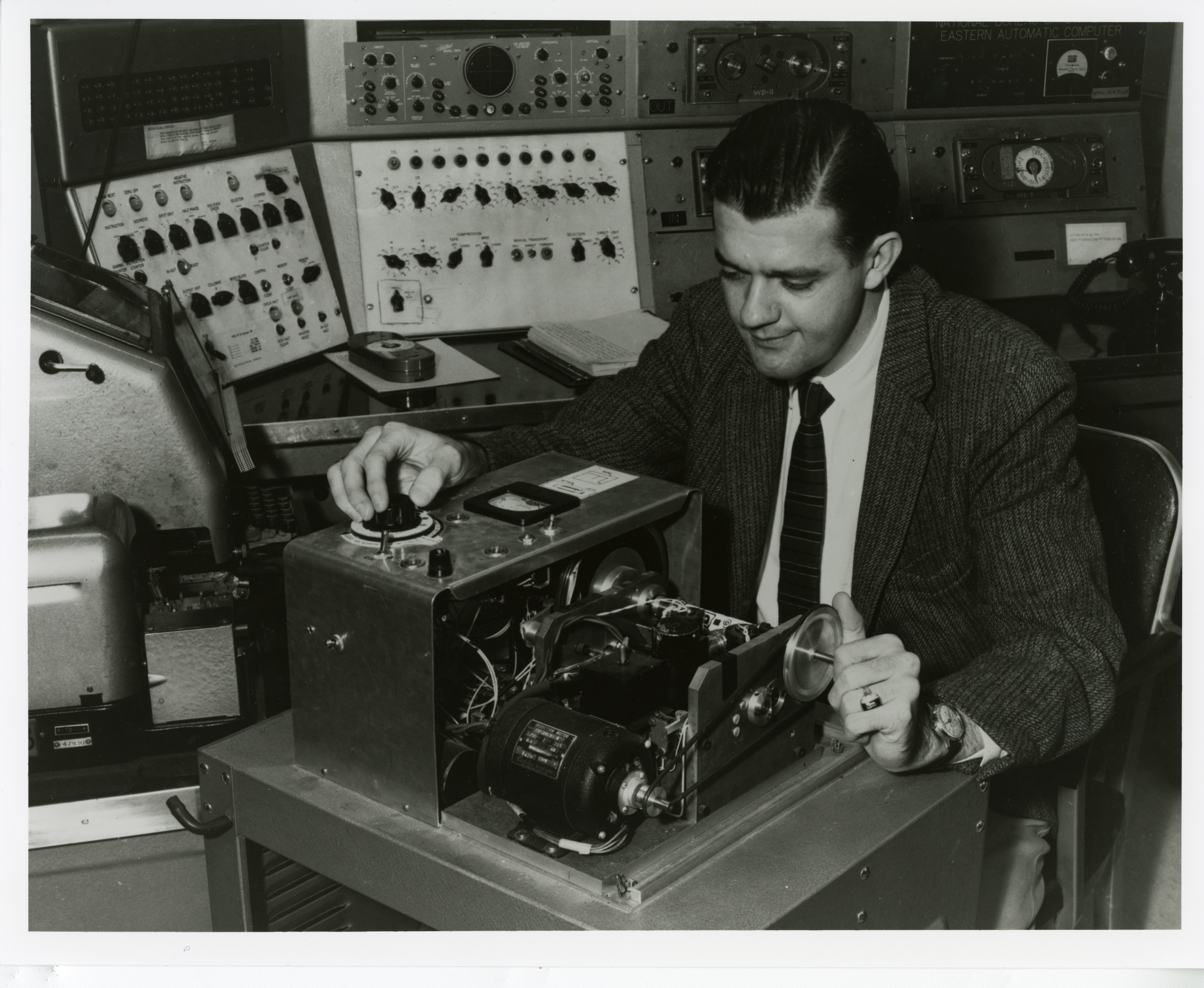
SEAC scanner

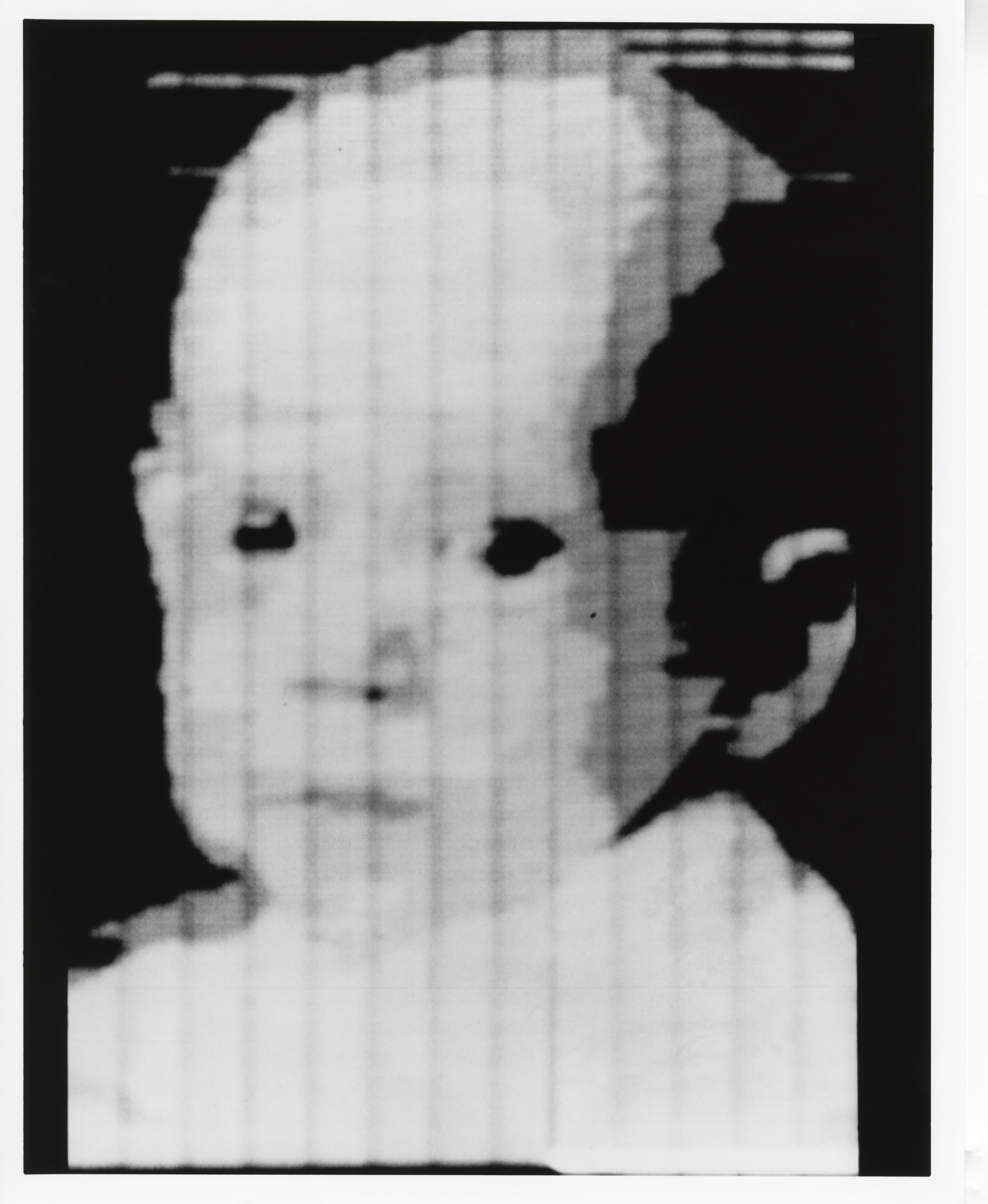
First image scanned into SEAC, son of Russell A. Kirsch

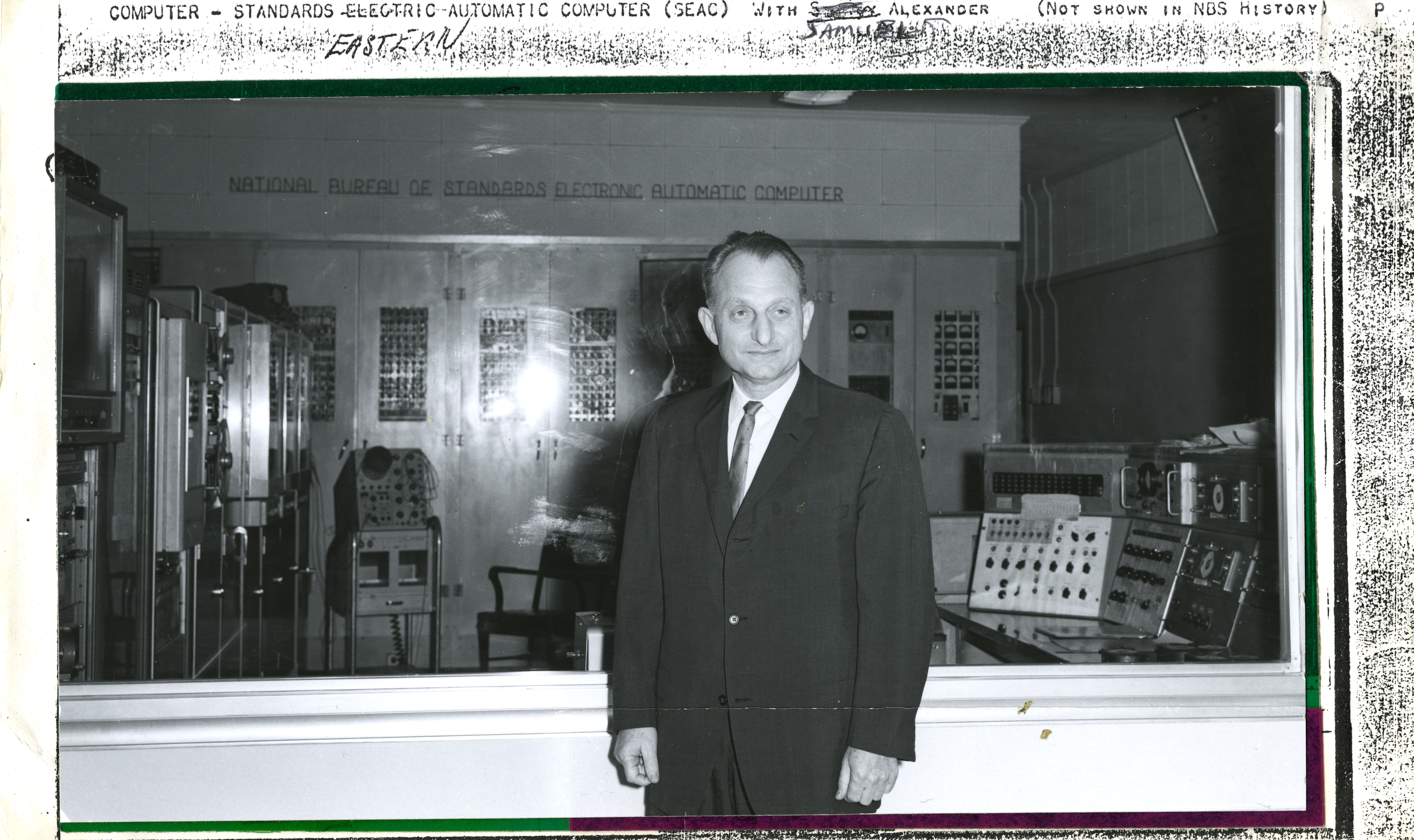
Samuel N. Alexander with SEAC

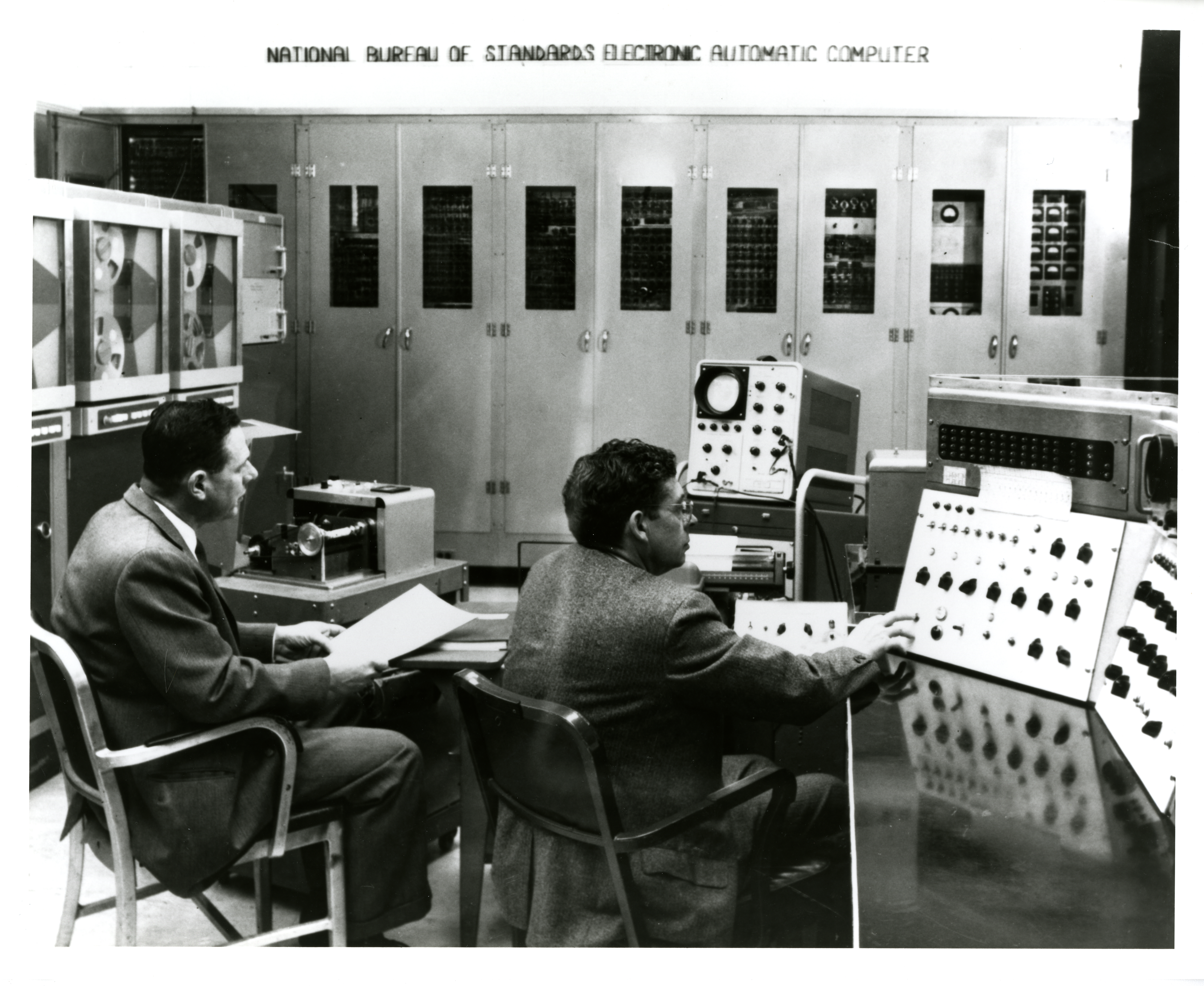
Horace Joseph and George A. Moore using the SEAC image scanner to analyze metallurgical photographs in 1960. Moore was legally blind.

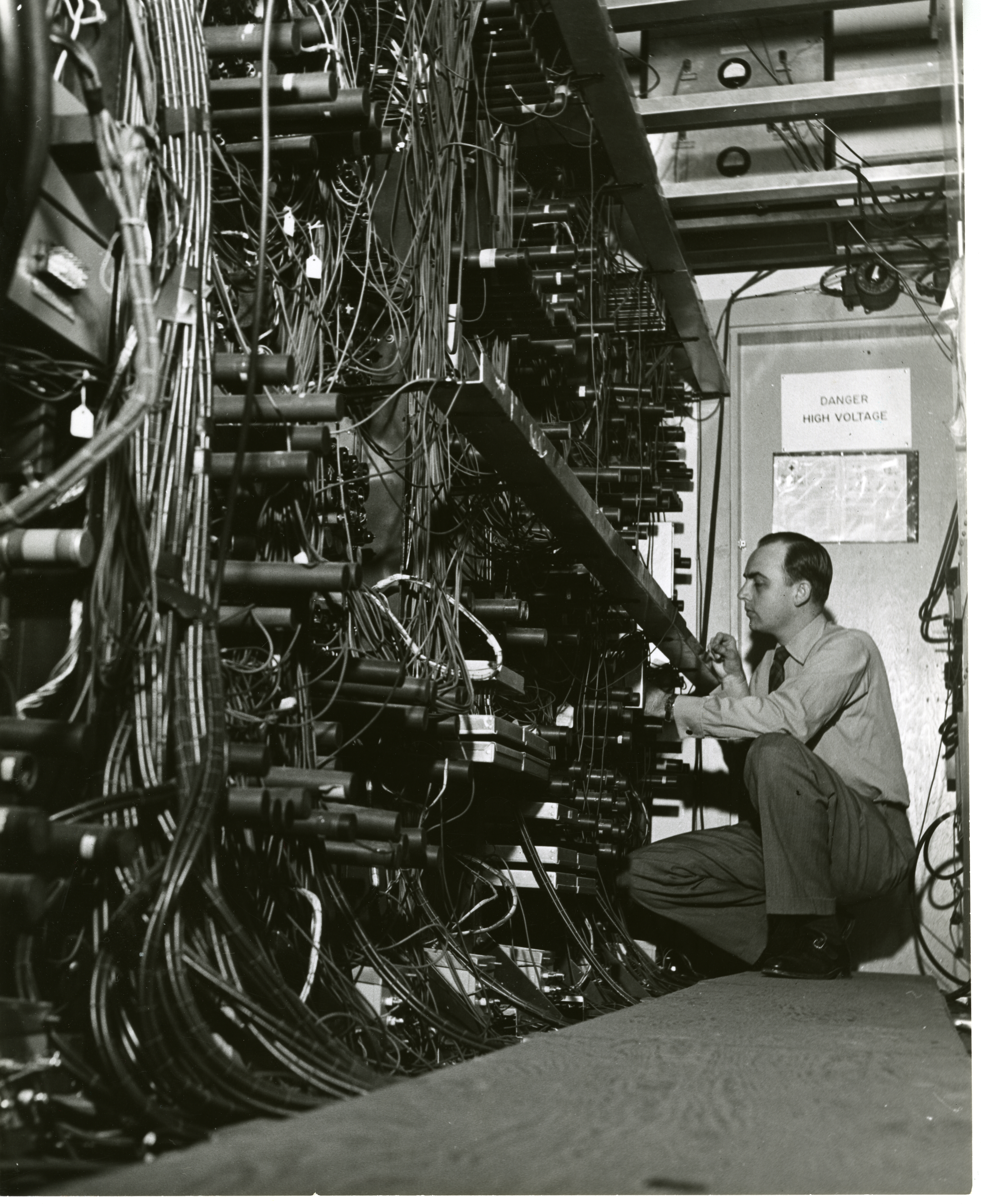
SEAC wiring

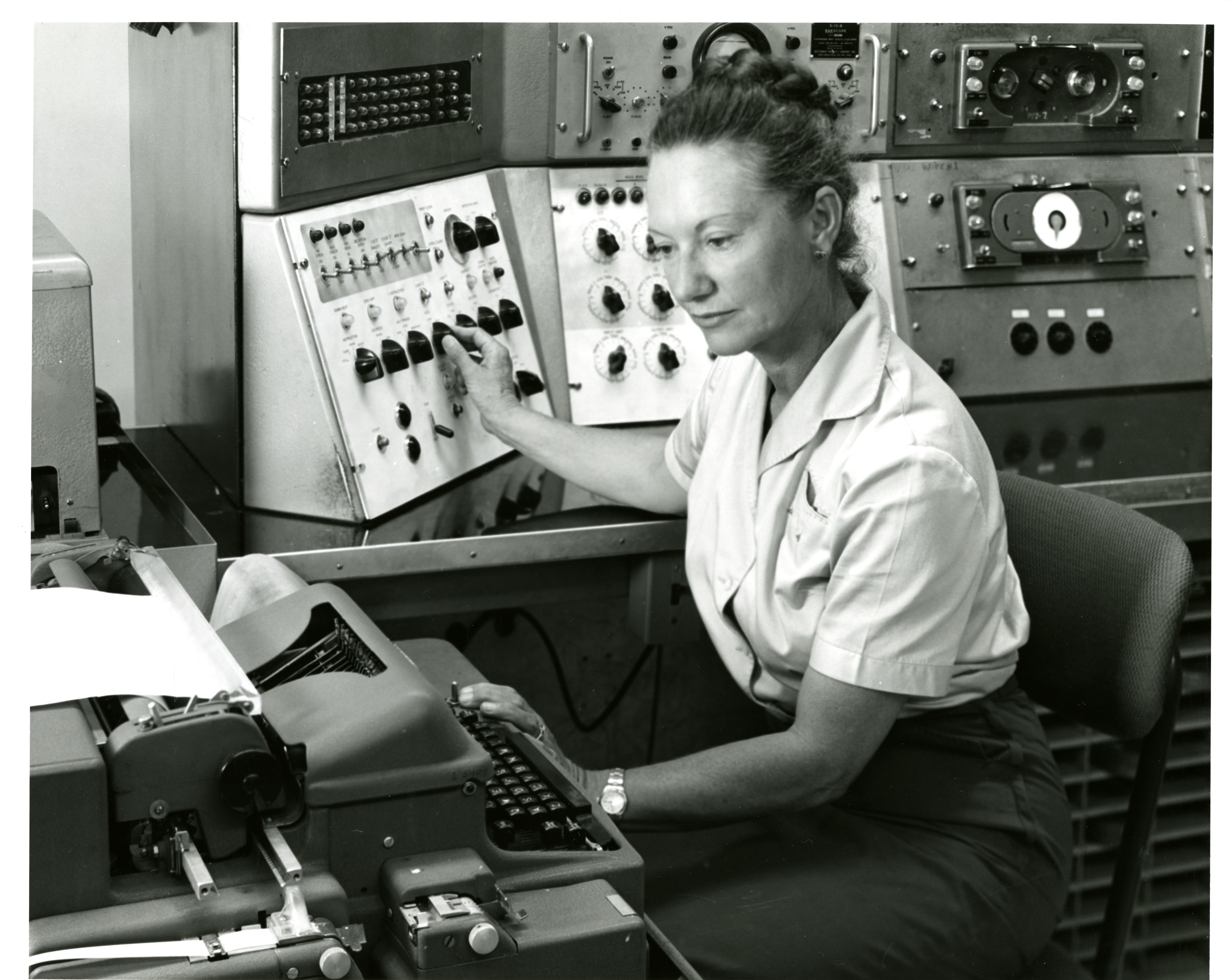
Ethel Marden at the control console of SEAC in 1959

== See also ==
- SWAC (Standards Western Automatic Computer)
- List of vacuum-tube computers
- Manchester Baby
