= Matilda effect =

Bias against acknowledging the achievements of women scientists

The Matilda effect is a bias against acknowledging the achievements of women scientists and inventors, whose work is consequently attributed to their male colleagues. This phenomenon was first described by suffragist and abolitionist Matilda Joslyn Gage (1826–1898) in her essay "Woman as Inventor" (first published as a tract in 1870 and later published in the North American Review, retitled "Woman as an Inventor", in 1883). The term Matilda effect was coined in 1993 by science historian Margaret W. Rossiter.

Rossiter provides several examples of this effect. Trotula (Trota of Salerno), a 12th-century Italian woman physician, wrote books which, after her death, were attributed to male authors. Nineteenth- and twentieth-century cases illustrating the Matilda effect include those of Nettie Stevens, Lise Meitner, Marietta Blau, Rosalind Franklin, and Jocelyn Bell Burnell.

The Matilda effect was compared to the Matthew effect, whereby an eminent scientist often gets more credit than a comparatively unknown researcher, even if their work is shared or similar.

== Research ==
In 2012, Marieke van den Brink and Yvonne Benschop from Radboud University Nijmegen showed that in the Netherlands the sex of professorship candidates influences the evaluation made of them. Similar cases are described by Andrea Cerroni and Zenia Simonella in a study corroborated further by a Spanish study. On the other hand, several studies found no difference between citations and impact of publications of male authors and those of female authors.

Swiss researchers have indicated that mass media asks male scientists more often to contribute on shows than they do their female fellow scientists.

According to one U.S. study, "although overt gender discrimination generally continues to decline in American society", "women continue to be disadvantaged with respect to the receipt of scientific awards and prizes, particularly for research".

== Examples ==
Examples of women subjected to the Matilda effect:

- Trotula (Trota of Salerno, 12th century) – Italian physician, author of works which, after her death, were attributed to male authors. Hostility toward women as teachers and healers led to denial of her very existence. At first her work was credited to her husband and son, but as information got passed on, monks and later male scholars confused her name for that of a man. She is not mentioned in the Dictionary of Scientific Biography. More recently, historian Monica Green has critiqued Rossiter and other writers use of Trota of Salerno as an example of the Matilda Effect due to complexities around Trota's reputation during the medieval period.
- Jeanne Baret (1740–1807) – French botanist, first woman to have completed a circumnavigation of the globe. Partner and collaborator of the botanist Philibert Commerson, she joined the expedition of Louis-Antoine de Bougainville disguised as a man. They collected the first specimens of Bougainvillea. Most botanical discoveries have been attributed to Commerson alone, after whom about a hundred of species have been named. She was immortalized for the first much later with the description of Solanum baretiae in 2012.
- Nettie Stevens (1861–1912) – discoverer of the XY sex-determination system. Her crucial studies of mealworms revealed for the first time that an organism's sex is determined by its chromosomes rather than by environmental or other factors. Stevens greatly influenced the scientific community's transition to this new line of inquiry: chromosomal sex determination. However, Thomas Hunt Morgan, a distinguished geneticist at the time, is generally credited with this discovery. Despite her extensive work in the field of genetics, Stevens' contributions to Morgan's work are often disregarded.
- Mary Whiton Calkins (1863–1930) – Harvard University researcher discovered that stimuli that were paired with other vivid stimuli would be recalled more easily. She also discovered that duration of exposure led to better recall. These findings, along with her paired-associations method, would later be used by G. E. Müller and E. B. Titchener, without any credit being given to Calkins.
- Gerty Cori (1896–1957) – Nobel-laureate biochemist, worked for years as her husband's assistant, despite having equal qualification as him for a professorial position.
- Rosalind Franklin (1920–1958) – now recognized as an important contributor to the 1953 discovery of DNA structure. At the time of the discovery by Francis Crick and James Watson, for which the two men received a 1962 Nobel Prize, her work was not properly credited (though Watson described the crucial importance of her contribution, in his 1968 book The Double Helix).
- Marthe Gautier (1925–2022) – now recognized for her important role in the discovery of the chromosomal abnormality that causes Down syndrome, a discovery previously attributed exclusively to Jérôme Lejeune.
- Marian Diamond (1926–2017) – working at the University of California, Berkeley, experimentally discovered the phenomenon of brain plasticity, which ran contrary to previous neurological dogma. When her seminal 1964 paper was about to be published, she discovered that the names of her two secondary co-authors, David Krech and Mark Rosenzweig, had been placed before her name (which, additionally, had been placed in parentheses). She protested that she had done the essential work described in the paper, and her name was then put in first place (without parentheses). The incident is described in a 2016 documentary film, My Love Affair with the Brain: The Life and Science of Dr. Marian Diamond.
- Harriet Zuckerman (born 1937) – Zuckerman supplied core data for her husband R. K. Merton's famous concept of the Matthew effect, which denotes the phenomenon where scientists of higher renown will typically gain substantially more credit and status from their work than their lesser known peers. In the initial 1968 publication on the concept her role was diminished to a series of endnotes rather than a co-authorship, which Merton later acknowledged as a mistake in subsequent versions of the article.
- Programmers of ENIAC (dedicated 1946) – several women made substantial contributions to the project, including Adele Goldstine, Kay McNulty, Betty Jennings, Betty Snyder, Marlyn Wescoff, Fran Bilas, and Ruth Lichterman, but histories of ENIAC have typically not addressed these contributions, and have at times focused on hardware accomplishments rather than software accomplishments.
- Ben Barres (1954–2017) was a neurobiologist at Stanford University Medical School who transitioned from female to male. He spoke of his scientific achievements having been perceived differently, depending on what sex others thought he was at the time. Prior to his transition to male, Barres' scientific achievements were ascribed to men or devalued, but after transitioning to male, his achievements were credited to him and lauded.

Examples of men scientists favored over women scientists for Nobel Prizes:

- In 1934, the Nobel Prize in Physiology or Medicine was awarded to George Whipple, George Richards Minot, and William P. Murphy. They felt their female co-worker, Frieda Robscheit-Robbins, was excluded on grounds of her sex. Whipple, however, shared the prize money with her as he felt she deserved the Nobel as well, since she was co-author of almost all of Whipple's publications.
- In 1944 the Nobel Prize in Chemistry was given to Otto Hahn as the sole recipient. Lise Meitner had worked with Hahn and had laid the theoretical foundations for nuclear fission (she coined the term nuclear fission). Meitner was not recognized by the Nobel Prize Committee, partly due to her gender and partly due to her persecuted Jewish identity in Nazi Germany. She was affected by the Law for the Restoration of the Professional Civil Service, which prohibited Jews from holding government-related positions, including in research. Initially, her Austrian citizenship shielded her from persecution, but she fled Germany after Hitler's annexation of Austria in 1938.
- In 1950, Cecil Powell received the Nobel Prize in Physics for his development of the photographic method of studying nuclear processes and for the resulting discovery of the pion (pi-meson). Marietta Blau did pioneering work in this field. Erwin Schrödinger had nominated her for the prize along with Hertha Wambacher, but both were excluded.
- In 1956, two American physicists, Tsung-Dao Lee and Chen Ning Yang, predicted the violation of the parity law in weak interactions and suggested a possible experiment to verify it. In 1957, Chien-Shiung Wu performed the necessary experiment in collaboration with National Institute of Standards and Technology and showed the parity violation in the case of beta decay. The Nobel Prize in Physics in 1957 was awarded to the male physicists and Wu was omitted. She was the first to receive the Wolf Prize in Physics in 1978 in recognition for her work.
- In 1958, Joshua Lederberg shared a Nobel Prize in Physiology or Medicine with George Beadle and Edward Tatum. Microbiologists Joshua Lederberg and his wife Esther Lederberg, along with Beadle and Tatum, developed replica plating, a method of transferring bacterial colonies from one petri dish to another, which is vital to current understanding of antibiotic resistance. However, Esther Lederberg was not recognized for her vital work on this research project; her contribution was paramount to the successful implementation of the theory. Furthermore, she did not receive recognition for her discovery of the lambda phage or for her studies on the F fertility factor that created a foundation for future genetic and bacterial research.
- In the late 1960s, Jocelyn Bell Burnell (born 1943) discovered the first radio pulsar. For this discovery, in 1974 a Nobel Prize in Physics was awarded to her supervisor Antony Hewish and to Martin Ryle, citing Hewish and Ryle for their pioneering work in radio-astrophysics. Jocelyn Burnell was left out. At the time of her discovery, she was a Ph.D. student. She felt the intellectual effort had been mostly her supervisor's, but her omission from the Nobel Prize was criticized by several prominent astronomers, including Fred Hoyle.

== Legacy ==
The Matilda effect has also shaped educational and public history projects that work to recover the stories of women scientists whose contributions have been ignored, minimized, or reassigned to men. The Matilda Project is an educational resource that uses illustrated biographies, classroom materials, and public-facing storytelling to raise awareness of inequality and gender bias in STEM. The Spanish Association of Women Researchers and Technologists (AMIT) created a movement called "No More Matildas" that honors Matilda Joslyn Gage. The campaign's goal is to promote the number of women in science from an early age, eliminating stereotypes.

== See also ==
- Stigler's law of eponymy
- History of science
- History of technology
- Matthew effect
- Sociology of science
- Women in science
- Timeline of women in science
- Cryptogyny
