= Programmer =

Person who writes computer software

Computer programmer
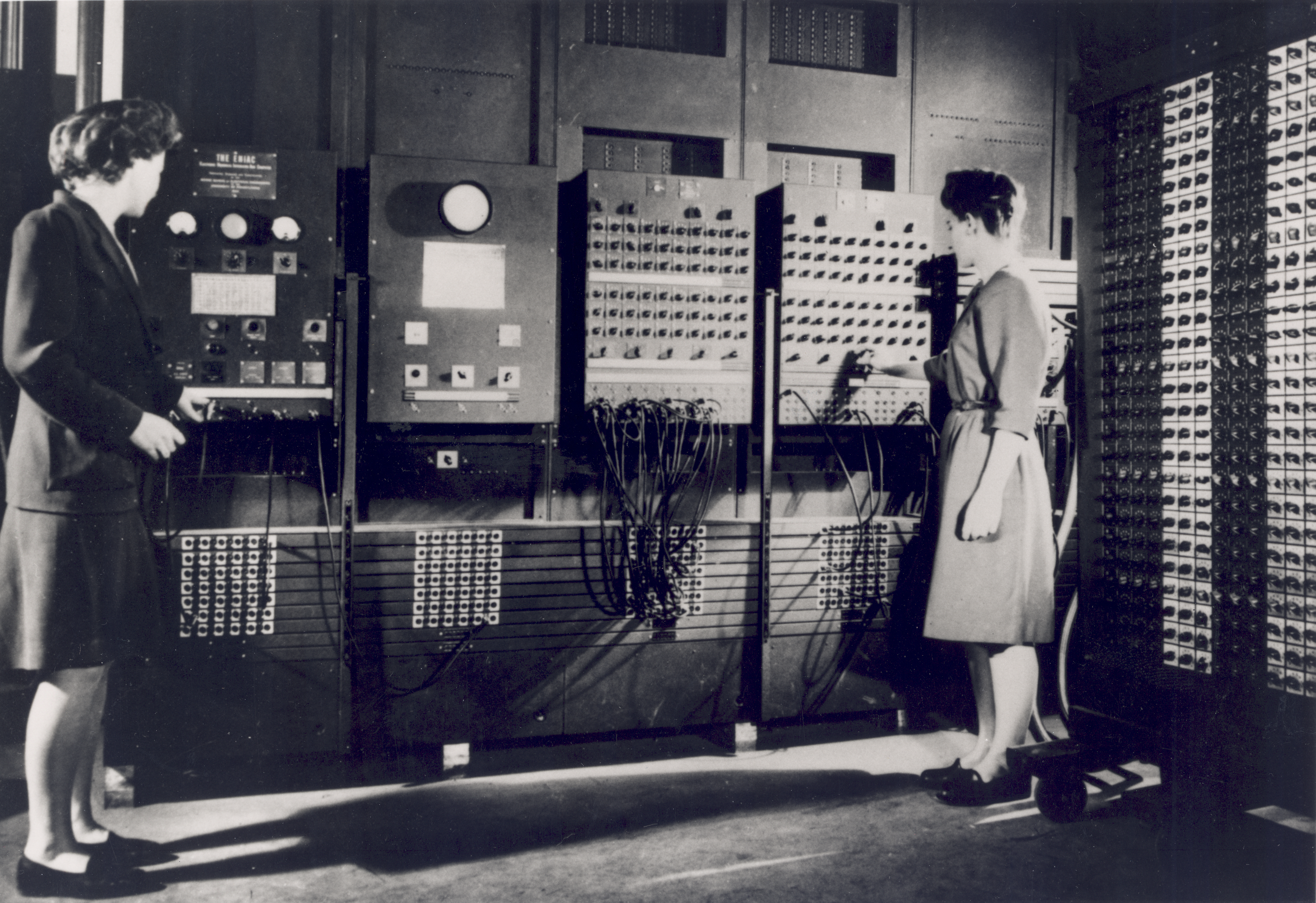
- Betty Jennings and Fran Bilas, part of the first ENIAC programming team

Occupation
- Names: Computer Programmer
- Occupation type: Profession
- Activity sectors: Information technology, Software industry

Description
- Competencies: Writing and debugging computer code
- Education required: Varies from apprenticeship to bachelor's degree, or self-taught

A programmer, computer programmer or coder is an author of computer source code, or someone with skill in computer programming. The professional titles software developer and software engineer may be used for jobs that require a programmer.

== Job title ==
A software developer primarily implements software based on specifications and fixes bugs. Other duties may include reviewing code changes and testing. To achieve the required skills for the job, they might obtain a computer science or associate degree, attend a programming boot camp or be self-taught.

A software engineer usually is responsible for the same tasks as a developer plus broader responsibilities of software engineering including architecting and designing new features and applications, targeting new platforms, managing the software development lifecycle (design, implementation, testing, and deployment), leading a team of programmers, communicating with customers, managers and other engineers, considering system stability and quality, and exploring software development methodologies.

Sometimes, a software engineer is required to have a degree in software engineering, computer engineering, or computer science. Some countries legally require an engineering degree to be called engineer.

== History ==
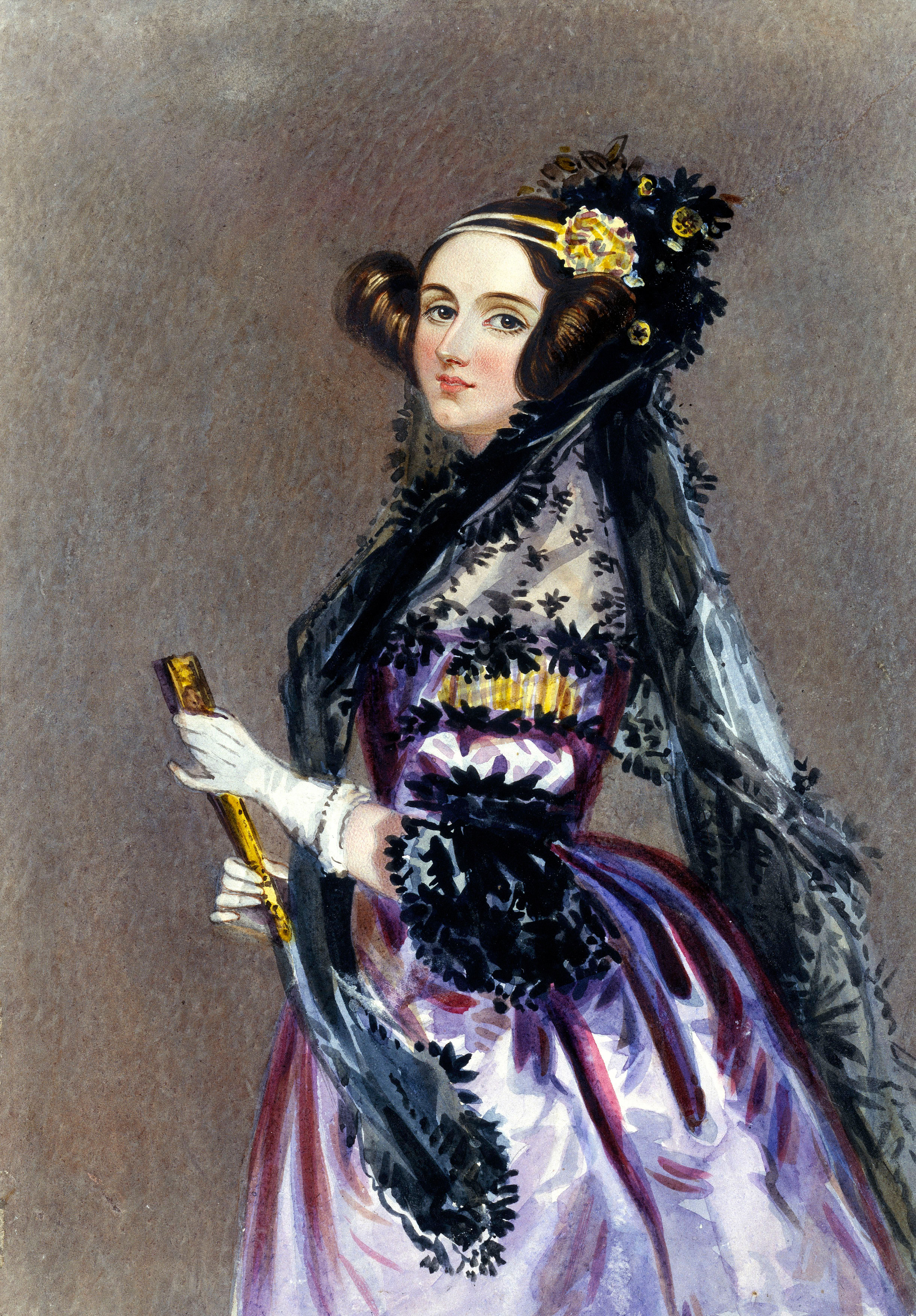
Ada Lovelace is considered by many to be the first computer programmer.

British countess and mathematician Ada Lovelace is often considered to be the first computer programmer. She authored an algorithm for calculating Bernoulli numbers on the Charles Babbage analytical engine, which was published in October 1942. As the machine was not completed in her lifetime, she never experienced the algorithm in action.

In 1941, German civil engineer Konrad Zuse was the first person to execute a program on a working, program-controlled, electronic computer. From 1943 to 1945, per computer scientist Wolfgang K. Giloi and AI professor Raúl Rojas et al., Zuse created the first, high-level programming language, Plankalkül.

Members of the 1945 ENIAC programming team of Kay McNulty, Betty Jennings, Betty Snyder, Marlyn Wescoff, Fran Bilas and Ruth Lichterman have since been credited as the first professional computer programmers.

== The software industry ==
The first company founded specifically to provide software products and services was the Computer Usage Company in 1955. Before that time, computers were programmed either by customers or the few commercial computer manufacturers of the time, such as Sperry Rand and IBM.

The software industry expanded in the early 1960s, almost immediately after computers were first sold in mass-produced quantities. Universities, governments, and businesses created a demand for software. Many of these programs were written in-house by full-time staff programmers; some were distributed between users of a particular machine for no charge, while others were sold on a commercial basis. Other firms, such as Computer Sciences Corporation (founded in 1959), also started to grow. Computer manufacturers soon started bundling operating systems, system software and programming environments with their machines; the IBM 1620 came with the 1620 Symbolic Programming System and FORTRAN.

The industry expanded greatly with the rise of the personal computer (PC) in the mid-1970s, which brought computing to the average office worker. In the following years, the PC also helped create a constantly growing market for games, applications and utility software.

== Nature of the work ==
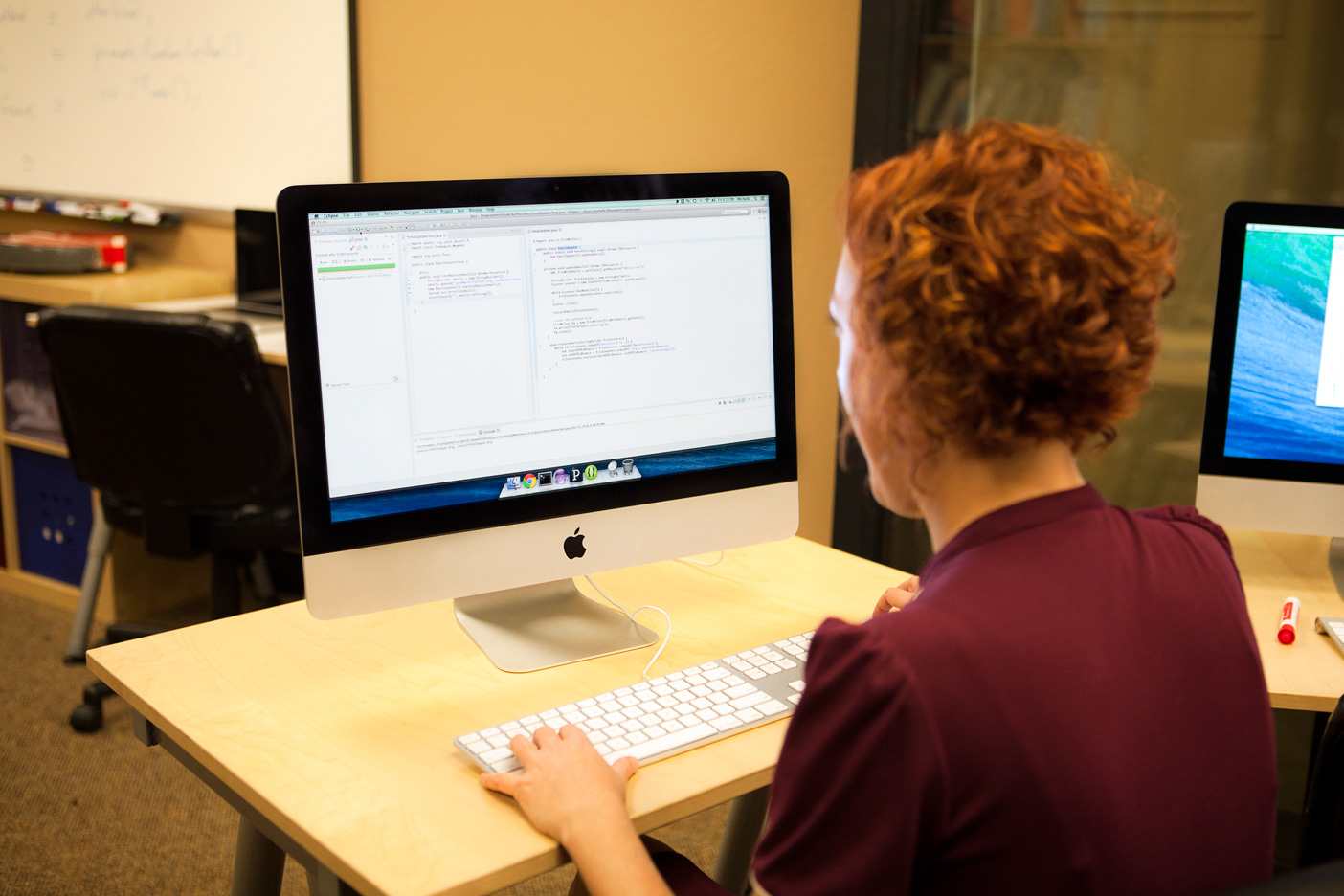
Programmer at work

Computer programmers write, test, debug, and maintain the detailed instructions, called computer programs, that computers must follow to perform their functions. Programmers also conceive, design, and test logical structures for solving problems by computer. Many technical innovations in programming — advanced computing technologies and sophisticated new languages and programming tools — have redefined the role of a programmer and elevated much of the programming work done today. Job titles and descriptions may vary, depending on the organization.

Programmers work in many settings, including corporate information technology (IT) departments, big software companies, small service firms and government entities of all sizes. Many professional programmers also work for consulting companies at client sites as contractors. Licensing is not typically required to work as a programmer, although professional certifications are commonly held by programmers. Programming is considered a profession.

=== Types of software ===
Programming editors, also known as source code editors, are text editors that are specifically designed for programmers or developers to write the source code of an application or a program. Most of these editors include features useful for programmers, which may include color syntax highlighting, auto indentation, auto-complete, bracket matching, syntax check, and allows plug-ins. These features aid the users during coding, debugging and testing.

== Globalization ==
=== Market changes in the UK ===
According to BBC News, 17% of computer science students could not find work in their field six months after graduation in 2009 which was the highest rate of the university subjects surveyed while 0% of medical students were unemployed in the same survey.

=== Market changes in the US ===
After the crash of the dot-com bubble (1999–2001) and the Great Recession (2008), many U.S. programmers were left without work or with lower wages. In addition, enrollment in computer-related degrees and other STEM degrees (STEM attrition) in the US has been dropping for years, especially for women, which, according to Beaubouef and Mason, could be attributed to a lack of general interest in science and mathematics and also out of an apparent fear that programming will be subject to the same pressures as manufacturing and agriculture careers. For programmers, the U.S. Bureau of Labor Statistics (BLS) Occupational Outlook originally predicted a growth for programmers of 12 percent from 2010 to 2020 and thereafter a decline of -7 percent from 2016 to 2026 with 21800 fewer openings, a further decline of -9 percent from 2019 to 2029, a decline of -10 percent from 2021 to 2031, and then a decline of -11 percent from 2022 to 2032 with 9700 fewer openings. 2024 to 2034 a decline of -6 percent. The current prediction for 2025 to 2035 is a decline of -7 percent with 8700 fewer openings. Since computer programming can be done from anywhere in the world, companies sometimes hire programmers in countries where wages are lower. If domestic demand has increased, it is mainly to replace the attrition of aging programmers or those abandoning this occupation. However, for software developers BLS projects current growth at 10% that is down from their prediction from 2024 to 2034 increase of 15% and 2019 to 2029 of a 22% increase in employment, from 1,469,200 to 1,785,200 jobs with a median base salary of $110,000 per year. This prediction is lower than the earlier 2010 to 2020 predicted increase of 30% for software developers. Though the distinction is somewhat ambiguous, software developers engage in a wider array of aspects of application development and are generally higher skilled than programmers, making outsourcing less of a risk. Another reason for the decline for programmers is their skills are being merged with other professions, such as developers, as employers increase the requirements for a position over time (i.e. full-stack developer). This skill consolidation has led some employers to claim there is a skills shortage with regard to programming talent. However, US programmers and unions counter that some are exaggerating their case in order to obtain programmers from countries with lower wages and avoid paying for training in very specific technologies. Then there is the additional concern that recent advances in artificial intelligence and vibe coding might drastically impact the demand for future generations of Software professions even as schools are increasingly emphasizing programming as a career.

=== Market changes in Japan ===
As of 2024 in Japan, the demand for programmers is increasing rapidly due mainly to the aging demographics of their workforce and their low birth rate not being sufficient for replacement has led to more use of AI to help fill the gap. On the other hand, despite the fact that there are more than 1.2 million programmers in Japan as of 2020, more than 40% of Japanese companies say they do not have enough skilled and qualified IT personnel, including programmers; by 2030, the number of programmers will exceed 1.6 million, but about 800,000 people, including programmers, a shortage of engineers is expected to occur.

== Programming education ==
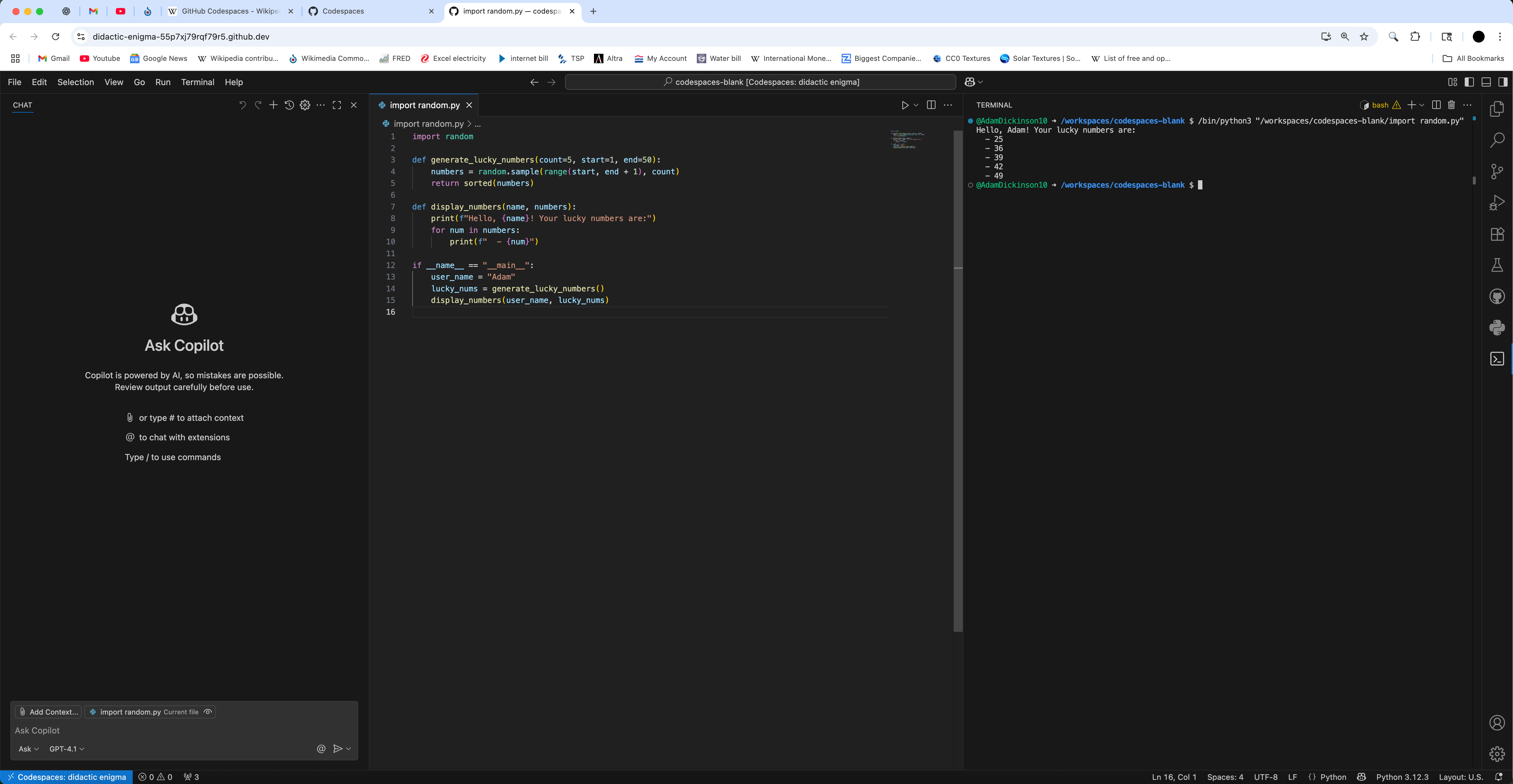
GitHub Codespaces is an online integrated development environment that requires minimal setup to get started programming.

Programming education involves the teaching and learning of computer programming concepts, languages, and practices. It is offered through various formats, including formal computer science degree programs, vocational training, career and technical education centers, coding bootcamps, libraries, online courses, and self-directed learning. Educational initiatives often focus on problem-solving, computational thinking, logical thinking, and the development of algorithms. In primary and secondary education, programming is increasingly integrated into computer literacy curricula through initiatives such as Hour of Code, Code Club, Learn to Code, and by getting computers in the classroom. At the higher education level, programming instruction may include coursework in software engineering, data structures, debugging, software design, and specialized domains such as game development, artificial intelligence, cryptography, or data science. Numerous platforms and resources like AI chat bots, educational programming software, and online integrated development environments have expanded access to programming education.

== See also ==
- List of programmers
- List of programming occupations
- List of programming languages
- Lists of programming software development tools
- Software development process
- Software engineering
- Systems architect
- Video game programmer
- 996 working hour system
- Wikibooks computer programming resources
