= Severo Antonelli =

Italian-American photographer

- Born: July 17, 1907; Fara Filiorum Petri, Kingdom of Italy
- Died: December 9, 1995 (aged 88)
- Known for: Photography
- Movement: Futurism

Severo Antonelli (ca. July 17, 1907 – December 9, 1995) was an Italian-American photographer often associated with the Futurist movement.

== Early years ==
Born in Fara Filiorum Petri, Chieti, Italy, in 1907, Antonelli arrived in Philadelphia with his family when he was fourteen. His father, a cabinet maker working for the Victor company, died when he was seventeen. Antonelli left school to support the family. In the evenings he attended classes at the Graphic Sketch Club in Philadelphia.

In 1925 he opened his own studio in Philadelphia. He received international acclaim during the late 1920s and early 1930s. Antonelli's photographs received top awards at major shows in Paris, London, Barcelona, Rotterdam, Brussels, Rome, and Tokyo. Considered a major "futurist" artist and photographer, as well as a "photo-picturalist", he built his international reputation and career on his imaginative portrayals of the human figure and face, works that range from playful to provocative; he was also renowned for his industrial and commercial art.

== Community leader ==
Antonelli was a legendary figure in the history of the Philadelphia Italian-American community, enhancing the Italian contribution to American culture and enriching the history of photography in Philadelphia. He was active in several Italian-American organizations, such as Order Sons of Italy in America and the America-Italy Society of Philadelphia. He was one of the founding members of The Da Vinci Art Alliance located and still active in Philadelphia.

In 1938 he founded the Antonelli School of Photography, later known as the Antonelli Institute Graphic Art & Photography, to train professional photographers. It proved especially popular among World War II veterans seeking training in photography. He served as its president until 1974. A few years later, the school earned national accreditation, and in 1984, it added its graphic design degree program. In 1996 it moved to Erdenheim, Pennsylvania. In July 2017, the president of the Antonelli Institute announced that the institute will close down in 2018, due to ”uncertainties surrounding our future location and changes in the external environment”. Much of Antonelli Institute equipment's was donated to Harcum College, which also attracted some of its former staff, as part of a plan for two new degree programs - Digital Design and Photography - which will continue "Antonelli's legacy of providing outstanding arts education".

== Exhibitions ==
Severo Antonelli's work was featured (twice) in what remains the largest one-man photography exhibits ever held at the Smithsonian Institution.

In 1985, Woodmere Art Museum held a retrospective of his work. Antonelli was a long-time supporter of Woodmere and in 1986 he donated more than one hundred of his photographs to the Museum, many of which are part of the permanent collection. He also donated a large sum of money to the Museum for renovations in 1987.

== Marriage and death ==
In 1985, nearly eighty years old, Antonelli married Kay McNulty, one of the first computer programmers. They enjoyed nearly nine years of marriage before he was diagnosed with Alzheimer's disease. He died on December 9, 1995, just before their tenth wedding anniversary.
