= Adele Goldstine =

American computer programmer (1920–1964)

- Born: Adele Katz; December 21, 1920; New York City, U.S.
- Died: November 1964 (aged 43)
- Education: Hunter College (BA); University of Michigan (MA)
- Known for: First manual on electronic digital computer
- Spouse: Herman Goldstine (m. 1941)
- Children: 2
- Scientific career
- Fields: Computer Programming and Mathematics
- Workplaces: University of Pennsylvania; Los Alamos National Laboratory

Adele Goldstine (née Katz; December 21, 1920 – November 1964) was an American mathematician and computer programmer. She wrote the manual for the first electronic digital computer, ENIAC. Through her programming work, she was instrumental in converting the ENIAC from a computer that required reprogramming each time it was used to one capable of performing a set of fifty stored instructions.

== Early life and education ==
Goldstine was born in New York City on December 21, 1920, to Yiddish-speaking Jewish parents. She was one of two sisters.Her father, William Katz, was a businessman who emigrated from Pandėlys, Lithuania (then Russian Empire) in 1902. Goldstine attended Hunter College High School, then Hunter College. After receiving her B.A., she attended the University of Michigan, where she earned a Master's in mathematics at 22.

== Personal life ==
At the University of Michigan, she met Herman Goldstine, who was the military liaison and administrator for the construction of the ENIAC, and they were married in 1941. After marriage, Herman had his job as a manager for project ENIAC, while Adele went to the Moore School of Electrical Engineering at the University of Pennsylvania. Together, they had two children, born in 1952 and 1959. Adele Goldstine is also a Jewish woman

== Work on ENIAC ==
As an instructor of mathematics for the women "computers" at the Moore School, Goldstine trained some of the six women who were the original programmers of ENIAC to manually calculate ballistic trajectories (complex differential calculations). The job of computer was critical to the war effort, and women were regarded as capable of doing the work more rapidly and accurately than men. By 1943, and for the balance of World War II, essentially all computers were women as were many of their direct supervisors. She was the ENIAC's first programmer.

After Kay McNulty, Betty Jean Jennings, Betty Snyder, Marlyn Wescoff, Fran Bilas and Ruth Lichterman learned to understand the mechanics of the ENIAC, Goldstine was responsible for writing the Operators Manual for the ENIAC. Goldstines documenations of manual programming set a foundation that eventually helped the ENIAC to be able to have different coding langugages with instructions.These six women were known as the "ENIAC Six".Reconfiguring the machine to solve a different problem involved physically plugging and unplugging wires on the machine; it was called "setting-up," as the modern terminology of "program" had not yet come into use.

In 1946, Goldstine worked alongside Bartik and Dick Clippinger within programming sessions with a goal to successfully modify Clippinger's stored program to the ENIAC. John von Neumann, a consultant, was involved as well to save work for the programmers from needing to repeatedly plug and unplug patch cables in testing. Jean Bartik mentions Goldstine as her top three programming partners, the other two being Betty Holberton and Art Gehring. These programmers (Goldstine, Holberton, and Gehring) worked together on the Taub program, the program for physicist Abraham Taub to calculate numerical values for expressions in equations to ballistics research for the ENIAC.

== Post-war years ==
After the war, Goldstine continued her programming work with von Neumann at Los Alamos National Laboratory, where she devised problems for ENIAC to process. After the war, she continued her ENIAC work with her husband and von Neumann at the Princeton University. In 1947 through 1948, Goldstine and her peer Richtmeyer worked on a computerized Monte Carlo simulation for Los Alamos, which later transitioned to Hippo, another atomic simulation where Goldstine did ENIAC coding on.

== Death ==
After having two children, in 1953 and 1960, she was diagnosed with cancer in 1962. She died two years later at the age of 43 in 1964.

== See also ==
- Kathleen Antonelli
- Jean Bartik
- Betty Holberton
- Marlyn Meltzer
- Frances Spence
- Ruth Teitelbaum
