= Eugenia Tenenbaum =

Galician feminist and art historian

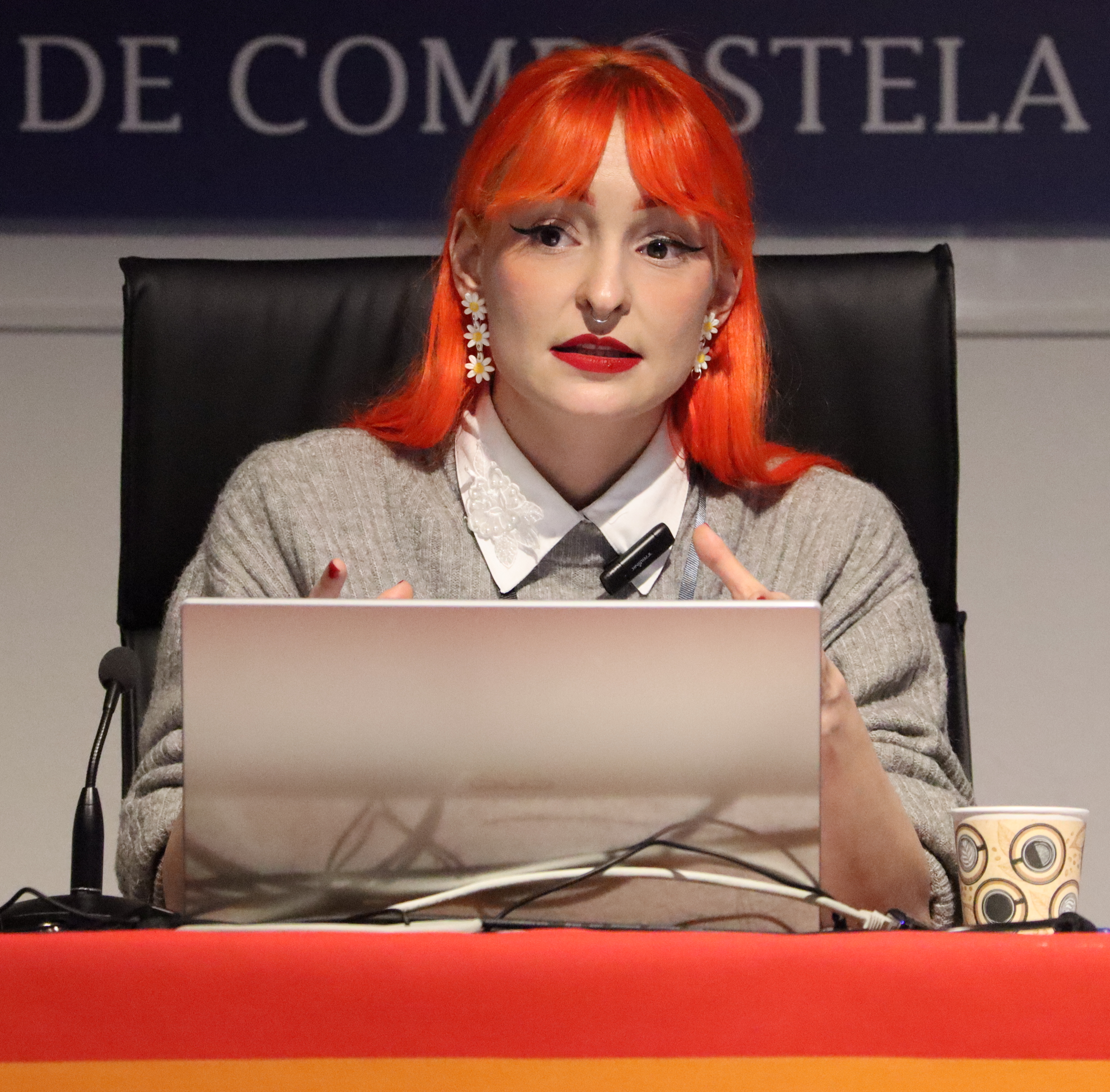
- Tenenbaum in 2023
- Born: 1996 (age 29–30); Santiago de Compostela, Galicia, Spain
- Education: Complutense University of Madrid
- Occupations: art historian, writer, influencer, feminist and LGBTQ+ activist
- Notable work: La mirada inquieta Las mujeres detrás de Picasso

Eugenia Tenenbaum (born 1996) is Spanish art historian, writer, influencer, feminist and LGBTQ rights activist.

== Biography ==
Tenenbaum was born in 1996 in Santiago de Compostela and took her pseudonym from Wes Anderson's film The Royal Tenenbaums.

She studied Art History at the Complutense University of Madrid, and has remained living in Madrid.

She has been employed as a publicist, raising awareness of topics related to literature, feminism and lesbianism. Tenenbaum is also active on using the social media sites Instagram and Patreon to share a feminist perspective of art history and to provide her followers with "tools to understand the gender perspective in art." She believes that social media allows a democratization of knowledge and power that does not occur within institutions.

In 2022, Tenenbaum published her first book, La mirada inquieta: cómo disfrutar del arte con tus propios ojos (The restless gaze: how to enjoy art with your own eyes), which explores women in art history who have been ignored by the "academy," as well as how women who have featured as subjects in art have been objectified. This was followed in 2023 with Las mujeres detrás de Picasso (The women behind Picasso), which examines the lives of the painter's lovers and wives.

Tenenbaum has spoken at the literature events Creativa Festival in Vigo and the Santiago Book Fair on the romanticisation of sexual violence in art from the ancient Greek and Roman periods. She has also delivered lectures to students at the Escola d'Art i Superior de Disseny de València (EASD) at the Universitat de València about epistemic injustice and cryptogyny in the history of art.

In 2024, she received the El Club de las 25 (The Club of 25) Award at the 27th annual awards for her work in disseminating information on gender issues outside of traditional media. She has also presented awards at the Museo Nacional Thyssen-Bornemisza in Madrid.

In 2025, she spoke on a debate about art against hopelessness on Radio 3. She is scheduled to open the celebration of the tenth anniversary of the Museo de Pontevedra.
