= Jean Bartik =

American computer programmer (1924–2011)

- Born: Betty Jean Jennings; December 27, 1924; Alanthus Grove, Missouri, U.S.
- Died: March 23, 2011 (aged 86); Poughkeepsie, New York, U.S.
- Education: Northwest Missouri State Teachers College (B.S., 1945); University of Pennsylvania (Master's 1967)
- Spouse: William Bartik
- Awards: Computer Pioneer Award of the IEEE Computer Society (2008)
- Engineering career
- Employers: University of Pennsylvania; Eckert–Mauchly Computer Corporation; Auerbach PublishersData Decisions
- Projects: ENIAC
- Awards: WITI Hall of Fame; Computer History Museum Fellow (2008)

Jean Bartik (née Betty Jean Jennings; December 27, 1924 – March 23, 2011) was an American computer programmer who was one of the original six programmers of the ENIAC computer.

Bartik studied mathematics in school then began work at the University of Pennsylvania, first manually calculating ballistics trajectories and then using ENIAC to do so. The other five ENIAC programmers were Betty Holberton, Ruth Teitelbaum, Kathleen Antonelli, Marlyn Meltzer, and Frances Spence. Bartik and her colleagues developed and codified many of the fundamentals of programming while working on the ENIAC, since it was the first computer of its kind.

After her work on ENIAC, Bartik went on to work on BINAC and UNIVAC, and spent time at a variety of technical companies as a writer, manager, engineer and programmer. She spent her later years as a real estate agent and died in 2011 from congestive heart failure complications.

Content-management framework Drupal's default theme, Bartik, is named in her honor.

== Early life and education ==
Born Betty Jean Jennings in Gentry County, Missouri in 1924, she was the sixth of seven children. Her father, William Smith Jennings (1893–1971) was from Alanthus Grove, where he was a schoolteacher as well as a farmer. Her mother, Lula May Spainhower (1887–1988) was from Alanthus. Jennings had three older brothers, William (January 10, 1915) Robert (March 15, 1918); and Raymond (January 23, 1922); two older sisters, Emma (August 11, 1916) and Lulu (August 22, 1919), and one younger sister, Mable (December 15, 1928).

In her childhood, she would ride on horseback to visit her grandmother, who bought the young girl a newspaper to read every day and became a role model for the rest of her life. She began her education at a local one-room school, and gained local attention for her softball skill. In order to attend high school, she lived with her older sister in the neighboring town, where the school was located, and then began to drive every day despite being only 14. She graduated from Stanberry High School in 1941, aged 16. She was given the title of salutatorian on her graduation.

She attended Northwest Missouri State Teachers College now known Northwest Missouri State University, majoring in mathematics with a minor in English and graduated in 1945. Jennings was awarded the only mathematics degree in her class. Although she had originally intended to study journalism, she decided to change to mathematics because she had a bad relationship with her adviser. Later in her life, she earned a master's degree in English at the University of Pennsylvania in 1967 and was awarded an honorary doctorate degree from Northwest Missouri State University in 2002.

== Career ==
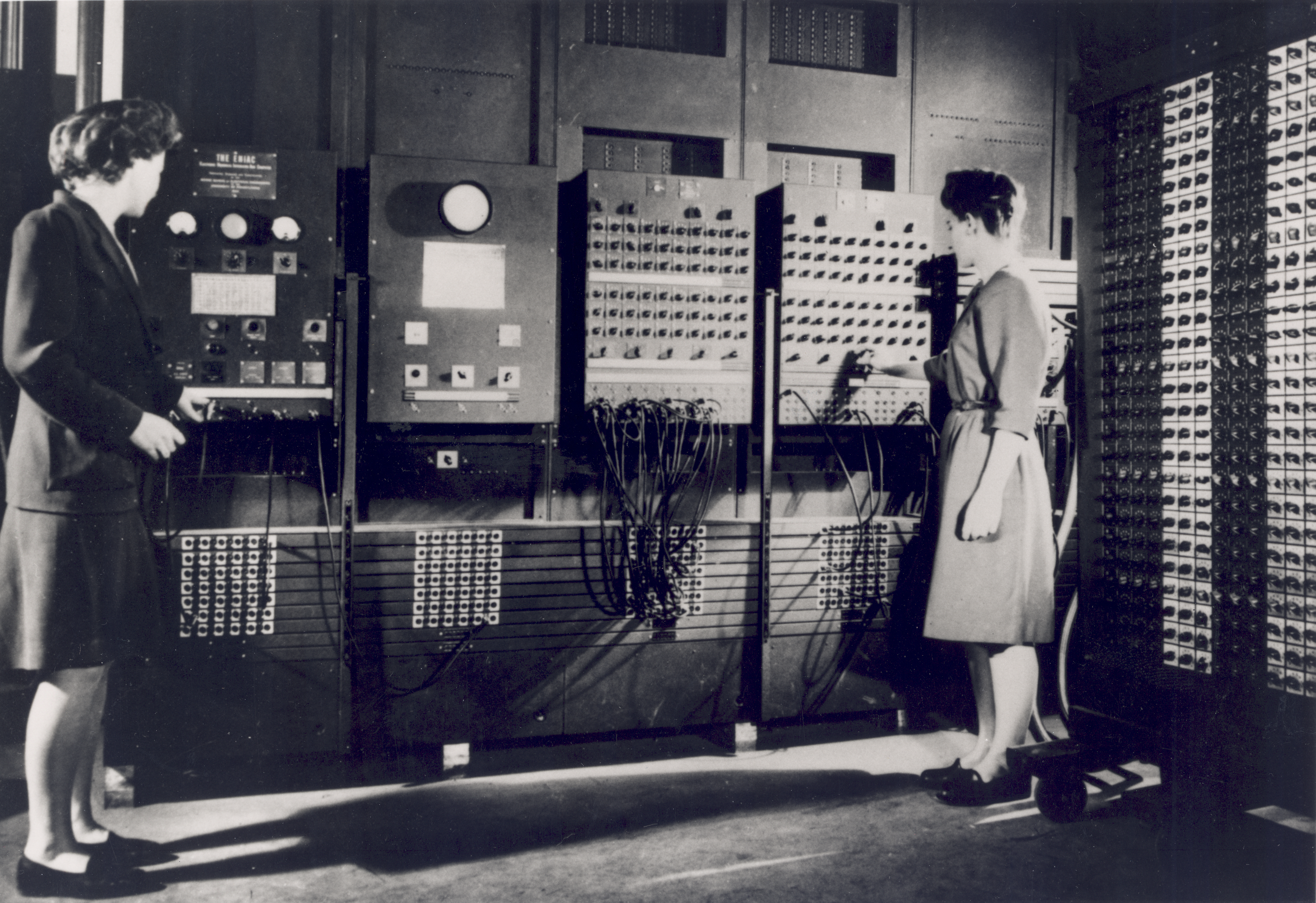
Programmers Betty Jean Jennings (left) and Fran Bilas (right) operate the ENIAC's main control panel.

The ENIAC Programmers (As Told By U.S. Chief Technology Officer Megan Smith)

In 1945, the United States Army was recruiting mathematicians from universities to aid in the war effort; despite a warning by her adviser that she would be "a cog in a wheel" with the Army, and encouragement to become a mathematics teacher instead, Bartik decided to become a human computer. Bartik's calculus professor encouraged her to take the job at University of Pennsylvania because they had a differential analyzer.

She applied to both IBM and the University of Pennsylvania at the age of 20. Although rejected by IBM, Jennings was hired by the University of Pennsylvania to work for Army Ordnance at Aberdeen Proving Ground, calculating ballistics trajectories by hand.

While working there, Bartik met her future husband, William Bartik, who was an engineer working on a Pentagon project at the University of Pennsylvania. They married in December 1946.

When the Electronic Numeric Integrator and Computer (ENIAC) was developed for the purpose of calculating the ballistic trajectories human computers like Bartik had been doing by hand, she applied to become a part of the project and was eventually selected to be one of its first programmers. Bartik was asked to set up problems for the ENIAC without being taught any techniques.

Bartik and five other women (Betty Holberton, Marlyn Wescoff, Kathleen McNulty, Ruth Teitelbaum, and Frances Spence) were chosen to be the main programmers for the ENIAC. They were known as the "Sensational Six". Many other women who are often unrecognized contributed to the ENIAC during a period of wartime male labor shortage.

Bartik, who became the co-lead programmer (with Betty Holberton), and the other four original programmers became extremely adept at running the ENIAC; with no manual to rely on, the group reviewed diagrams of the device, interviewed the engineers who had built it, and used this information to teach themselves the skills they needed. Initially, they were not allowed to see the ENIAC's hardware at all since it was still classified and they had not received security clearance; they had to learn how to program the machine solely through studying schematic diagrams. The six-woman team was also not initially given space to work together, so they found places to work where they could, in abandoned classrooms and fraternity houses.

While the six women worked on ENIAC, they developed subroutines, nesting, and other fundamental programming techniques, and arguably invented the discipline of programming digital computers. Bartik and the other ENIAC female programmers learned to physically modify the machine, moving switches and rerouting cables, in order to program it.

In addition to performing the original ballistic trajectories they were hired to compute, the six female programmers soon became operators on the Los Alamos nuclear calculations, and generally expanded the programming repertoire of the machine. Bartik's programming partner on the important trajectory program for the military that would prove that the ENIAC worked to specification was Betty Holberton, known at the time as Betty Snyder. Bartik and Holberton's program was chosen to introduce the ENIAC to the public and larger scientific community. That demonstration occurred on February 15, 1946, and was a tremendous success. The ENIAC proved that it operated faster than the Mark I, a well known electromechanical machine at Harvard, and also showed that the work that would take a "human computer" 40 hours to complete could be done in 20 seconds.

Bartik described the first public demonstration of the ENIAC in 1946:

The day ENIAC was introduced to the world was one of the most exciting days of my life. The demonstration was fabulous. ENIAC calculated the trajectory faster than it took the bullet to travel. We handed out copies of the calculations as they were run. ENIAC was 1,000 times faster than any machine that existed prior to that time. With its flashing lights, it also was an impressive machine illustrating graphically how fast it was actually computing.

The public demonstration was a success, but most of the congratulations on its turnout were given to its engineers, John Mauchly and John Eckert. Following the demonstration, in March 1946, she received a front-page feature in the Gentry County-based Stanberry Headlight, where it was written that, "[t]o acquaintances here of Miss Jennings, it is no great surprise to know that she is holding such an important position", due to her academic esteems.

Bartik was later asked to form and lead a group of programmers to convert the ENIAC into a stored program computer, working closely with John von Neumann, Dick Clippinger, and Adele Goldstine.

Bartik converted the ENIAC into a stored program computer by March 1948. As head of this process, Bartik was charged with the conversion that allowed the ENIAC to be turned into a rudimentary stored program computer to assist with Clippinger's wind tunnel programs, which allowed the ENIAC to operate more quickly, efficiently, and accurately.

Letters between Bartik and Adele Goldstine were discovered by authors Thomas Haigh and Mark Priestley during the time of the project, as well as the fact that much of the 60-order code was in Bartik's handwriting.

After the end of the war, Bartik went on to work with the ENIAC designers John Eckert and John Mauchly, and helped them develop the BINAC and UNIVAC I computers. BINAC was the first computer to use magnetic tape instead of punch cards to store data and the first computer to utilize the twin unit concept. BINAC was purchased by Northrop Aircraft to guide the Snark missile, but the BINAC proved to be too large for their purposes. However, according to a Northrop Aircraft programmer, claims that the BINAC did not work once it was moved to Northrop Aircraft were erroneous and the BINAC was working well into the mid-1950s. Besides BINAC, Jean's more important work involved her responsibilities in designing the UNIVAC's logic circuits among other UNIVAC programming and design tasks. Bartik also co-programmed with her life-long friend Betty Holberton the first generative programming system (SORT/MERGE) for a computer. Recalling her time working with Eckert and Mauchly on these projects, she described their close group of computer engineers as a "technical Camelot".

In the early 1950s, once the Eckert-Mauchly Corporation was sold to Remington Rand, Bartik went on to help train on how to program and use the UNIVAC for the first six UNIVACs sold, including the programmers at the United States Census Bureau (first UNIVAC sold) and Atomic Energy Commission. Later, Bartik moved to Philadelphia when her husband, William (Bill) Bartik, took a job with Remington Rand. Due to a company policy at the time about husbands and wives working together, Jean was asked to resign from the company. Between 1951 and 1954, prior to her first child's birth, Jean did mostly freelance programming assignments for John Mauchly and was a helpmate to her husband. Once her son was born, Jean walked away from her career in computing to concentrate on raising a family, during which time she had two other children with her husband. It was sometime during this 1950s period that Bartik began going by the name "Jean" rather than her birth first name "Betty", which is what she had been known as during her ENIAC, UNIVAC and Remington-Rand years.

Even though Bartik played an integral part in developing ENIAC, her work at University of Pennsylvania and on the ENIAC remained obscure until her pioneering work was documented by Kathy Kleiman and the ENIAC Programmers Project. In 1986, Kleiman first met and identified the women who worked with the ENIAC. Kleiman worked with PBS producer David Roland to record their oral histories and with documentary producers Jon Palfreman and Kate McMahon to produce the award-winning documentary The Computers (premiere 2014). The women's work was also popularized by columnist Tom Petzinger in articles for the Wall Street Journal on Bartik and Holberton in 1996.

== Later life ==
After getting her master's degree from the University of Pennsylvania in 1967 and making the decision to divorce her husband, Bartik joined the Auerbach Corporation writing and editing technical reports on minicomputers. Bartik remained with Auerbach for eight years, then moved among positions with a variety of other companies for the rest of her career as a manager, writer, and engineer. Jean Bartik and William Bartik divorced by 1968. Bartik ultimately retired from the computing industry in 1986 when her final employer, Data Decisions (a publication of Ziff-Davis), was sold; Bartik spent the following 25 years as a real estate agent.

Bartik died from congestive heart failure in a Poughkeepsie, New York nursing home on March 23, 2011. She was 86.

== Legacy ==
Starting in 1996, once the importance of their role in the development of computing was re-discovered, Bartik along with Betty Holberton and Bartik's other friend of over 60 years Kathleen Antonelli (ENIAC programmer and wife of ENIAC co-inventor John Mauchly) began to finally receive the acknowledgement and honors for their pioneering work in the early field of computing. Bartik and Antonelli became invited speakers both at home and abroad to share their experiences working with the ENIAC, BINAC and UNIVAC. Bartik especially went on to receive many honors and awards for her pioneering role programming the ENIAC, BINAC and UNIVAC, the latter of which helped to launch the commercial computer industry, and for turning the ENIAC into the world's first stored program computer.

In 2010, a documentary Top Secret Rosies: The Female "Computers" of WWII was released. The film centered around in-depth interviews of three of the six women programmers, focusing on the commendable patriotic contributions they made during World War II. The ENIAC was responsible for calculating bullet trajectories during the war.

The ENIAC team is also the subject of the 2013 short documentary film The Computers. This documentary, created by Kathy Kleiman and the ENIAC Programmers Project, combines actual footage of the ENIAC team from the 1940s with interviews with the female team members as they reflect on their time working together on the ENIAC. The Computers is the first part of a three-part documentary series, titled Great Unsung Women of Computing: The Computers, The Coders, and The Future Makers.

Bartik wrote her autobiography Pioneer Programmer: Jean Jennings Bartik and the Computer that Changed the World prior to her death in 2011 with the help of long-time colleagues, Dr. Jon T. Rickman and Kim D. Todd. The autobiography was published in 2013 by Truman State Press to positive reviews.

One of the best pieces of advice Bartik ever received was: "Don't ever let anyone tell you that you can't do something because they think you can't. You can do anything, achieve anything, if you think you can and you educate yourself to succeed." Encouraging girls and women to follow their dreams, she said, "If my life has proved anything, it is that women (and girls) should never be afraid to take risks and try new things."

The Jean Jennings Bartik Computing Museum at Northwest Missouri State University in Maryville, Missouri is dedicated to the history of computing and Bartik's career.

The default theme in the content management framework Drupal, was named Bartik for over a decade. It was named in her honor.

== Awards and honors ==
- Inductee, Women in Technology International Hall of Fame (1997).
- Fellow, Computer History Museum (2008)
- IEEE Computer Pioneer Award, IEEE Computer Society (2008)
- Korenman Award from the Multinational Center for Development of Women in Technology (2009)

== See also ==
- Adele Goldstine
- Betty Holberton
- Frances Spence
- Ruth Teitelbaum
- Marlyn Wescoff
- Kathleen Antonelli
- List of pioneers in computer science
- Timeline of women in science
