= Sort Merge Generator =

The Sort Merge Generator was an application developed by Betty Holberton in 1951 for the Univac I and is one of the first examples of using a computer to create a computer program. The input to the application was a specification of files and the kind of sort and merge operations to use, and the output would be machine code for performing the specification.

== See also ==
- History of programming languages
- History of computers
