= Cryptogyny =

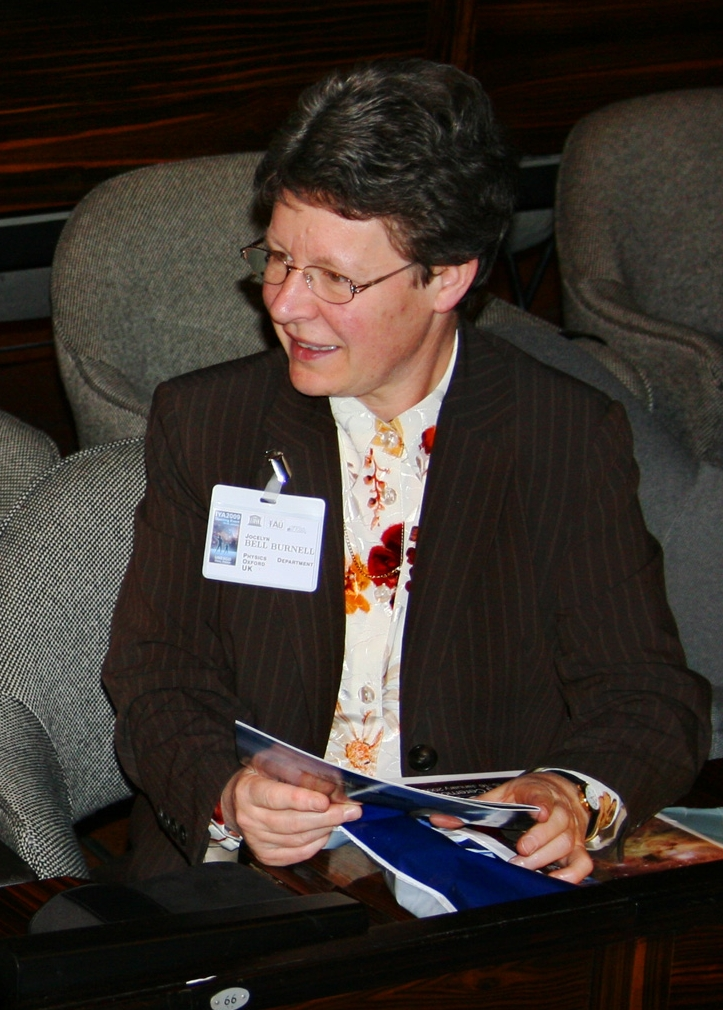
Jocelyn Bell Burnell discovered the first radio pulsar. For this discovery, in 1974 a Nobel Prize in Physics was awarded to her supervisor Antony Hewish and to Martin Ryle, citing Hewish and Ryle for their pioneering work in radio-astrophysics. Jocelyn Burnell was left out.

Cryptogyny is the recurring phenomenon, throughout history and in most cultures, of hiding women and female references in different spheres of society, especially the most prestigious ones.

== History ==
To name this practice, the poet and philologist Begonya Pozo and the philologist Carles Padilla, both senior lecturers at the University of Valencia, coined the term 'cryptogyny' and publicly disseminated it for the first time on February 5, 2020, in an article published in a digital diary. On November 27 of the same year, the Valencian Academy of Language approved its incorporation into the Valencian Normative Dictionary. Later, on March 8, 2021, the Basque dictionary Elhuyar Hiztegia included the Basque adaptation kryptogyny. In other languages, such as Spanish and French, although the term has not yet been made official, it has already been used (cryptogyny and cryptogynie, respectively) in academic fields and on social networks. In France, for example, in the 2021–2022 academic year, an inter-university seminar on Catalan literature was organized with the title De la cryptogynie à la mediatisation des escrivaines: Felícia Fuster and Carmelina Sánchez-Cutillas, about the Catalan-speaking authors Felícia Fuster and Carmelina Sánchez-Cutillas.

== Terminology ==
The term 'cryptogyny' is made up of two Greek lexemes, crypto ('hide, hide') and gyné ('woman') that are part of other words, generally cultisms, in Catalan and other languages. In fact, the Italian equivalent (the corresponding noun and adjective: cryptogyny or crittogynia and criptogina) can be found in some biology texts in reference to species in which the female or female organs are not externally visible. For example, the mealybug Suturaspis archangelskyae is described as "cryptogenic" and the 1839 Panlessico Italiano dictionary included the term crittogynia (with the synonym cryptogynia) to describe an aquatic fern in which the sporangium is hidden.

In the scientific field, the minimization or concealment of research and discoveries carried out by female researchers, known as the "Matilda effect", is a case of cryptogyny. By coining the term, Pozo and Padilla wanted to name a phenomenon that was well known in the history of science and in the history of women, because "social conscience is satisfied with actions and omissions, with silences and with words: what is not included in the dictionary apparently does not exist". They consider that the concealment of women's achievements or their underestimation has been symbolic violence that has continued over time.

== See also ==
- Matilda effect
- Misogyny
