= Frances Spence =

American physicist and computer scientist

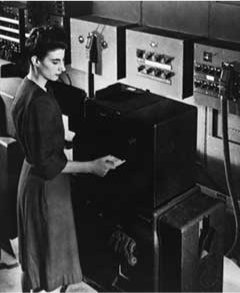
- Spence in 1946
- Born: Frances V. Bilas; March 2, 1922; Philadelphia, Pennsylvania, U.S.
- Died: July 18, 2012 (aged 90)
- Education: Temple University; Chestnut Hill College
- Occupation: Computer programmer
- Employer(s): Moore School of Electrical Engineering, University of Pennsylvania
- Spouse: Homer W. Spence (1947-death)
- Children: 3
- Awards: Women in Technology International Hall of Fame

Frances V. Spence (née Bilas; March 2, 1922 – July 18, 2012) was an American physicist and computer scientist. She was one of the original programmers for the ENIAC (the first electronic digital computer). She is considered one of the first computer programmers in history.

The other five ENIAC programmers were Betty Holberton, Ruth Teitelbaum, Kathleen Antonelli, Marlyn Meltzer, and Jean Bartik.

== Early life ==
She was born Frances V. Bilas in Philadelphia in 1922 and was the second of five sisters. Her parents both held jobs in the education sector, her father as an engineer for the Philadelphia Public School System and her mother as a teacher.

Bilas attended the South Philadelphia High School for Girls and graduated in 1938. She originally attended Temple University, but switched to Chestnut Hill College after being awarded a scholarship. She majored in mathematics with a minor in physics and graduated in 1942. While there, she met Kathleen Antonelli, who later also became an ENIAC programmer.

== Personal life ==
In 1947, she married Homer W. Spence, an Army electrical engineer from the Aberdeen Proving Grounds who had been assigned to the ENIAC project and later became head of the Computer Research Branch. They had three sons (Joseph, Richard, and William).

Frances Spence had continued working on the ENIAC in the years after the war, but shortly after her marriage, she resigned to raise a family. She died in 2012 and is buried at the Cemetery of the Holy Rood in Westbury, Nassau County, New York, USA.

== ENIAC career ==
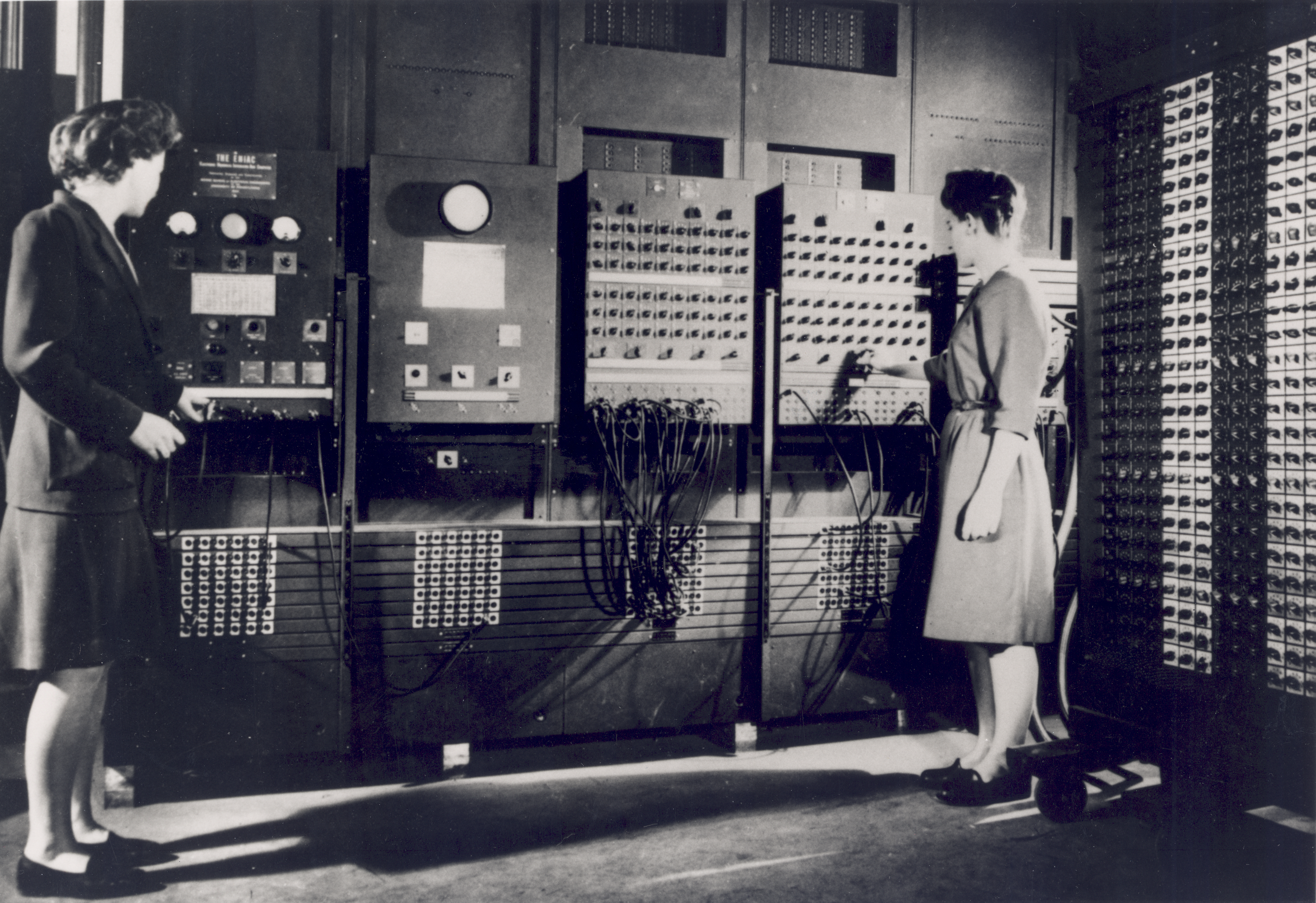
Programmers Betty Jean Jennings (left) and Frances Bilas (right) operate the ENIAC's main control panel.

The ENIAC project was a classified project by the US Army to construct the first all-electronic digital computer. While its hardware was primarily built by a team of men, its computational development was led by a team of six programmers (called "Computers"), all women from similar backgrounds as Spence. Despite her importance as one of the original programmers of the ENIAC, the role that she and the other female programmers took on was largely downplayed at the time due to the stigma that women were not interested in technology.

Photos of the women working on the computer often went without credit in newspapers at the time, and when the ENIAC was completed and unveiled to the public on February 15, 1946, the US Army failed to mention the names of the female programmers who had programmed the machine to run such sophisticated calculations. This further contributed to the perceived disconnect between women and computing.

Frances Bilas and the other women were originally hired by the University of Pennsylvania's Moore School of Engineering to create the ENIAC, which was needed to compute ballistics trajectories as part of a team of eighty women. The Moore School of Engineering was funded by the US Army, and at the time they were hiring female programmers in particular due to the fact that many young American men were fighting overseas in World War II.

Bilas and her Chestnut Hill College classmate Kathleen Antonelli were part of a smaller team within the ENIAC team. In addition to their larger programming duties, they were also assigned to the operation of an analog computing machine known as a Differential Analyzer, which was used to calculate ballistics equations (something which all the women on the ENIAC team were proficient at doing by hand). When the War ended, both Spence and Antonelli continued working with the ENIAC and they collaborated with other leading mathematicians.

== Legacy ==
In 1997, Spence was inducted into the Women in Technology International Hall of Fame, along with the other original ENIAC programmers. Their work paved the way for the electronic computers of the future, and their innovation kick-started the rise of electronic computing and computer programming in the Post-World War II era.

In 2010, a documentary called, "Top Secret Rosies: The Female "Computers" of WWII" was released. The film centered around in-depth interviews of three of the six women programmers, focusing on the commendable patriotic contributions they made during World War II.

The ENIAC Programmers (As Told By U.S. Chief Technology Officer Megan Smith)

The ENIAC team is the inspiration behind the award-winning 2013 documentary The Computers. This documentary, created by Kathy Kleiman and the ENIAC Programmers Project, combines actual footage of the ENIAC team from the 1940s with interviews with the female team members as they reflect on their time working together on the ENIAC. It is the first documentary of a series of three, and parts two and three will be entitled The Coders and The Future-Maker, respectively.

== See also ==
- Kathleen Antonelli
- Jean Bartik
- Betty Holberton
- Adele Goldstine
- Ruth Teitelbaum
- Marlyn Meltzer
- Timeline of women in science
