= Alanthus Grove, Missouri =

Unincorporated community in Gentry County, Missouri, United States

Coordinates: 40°18′25″N 94°32′39″W

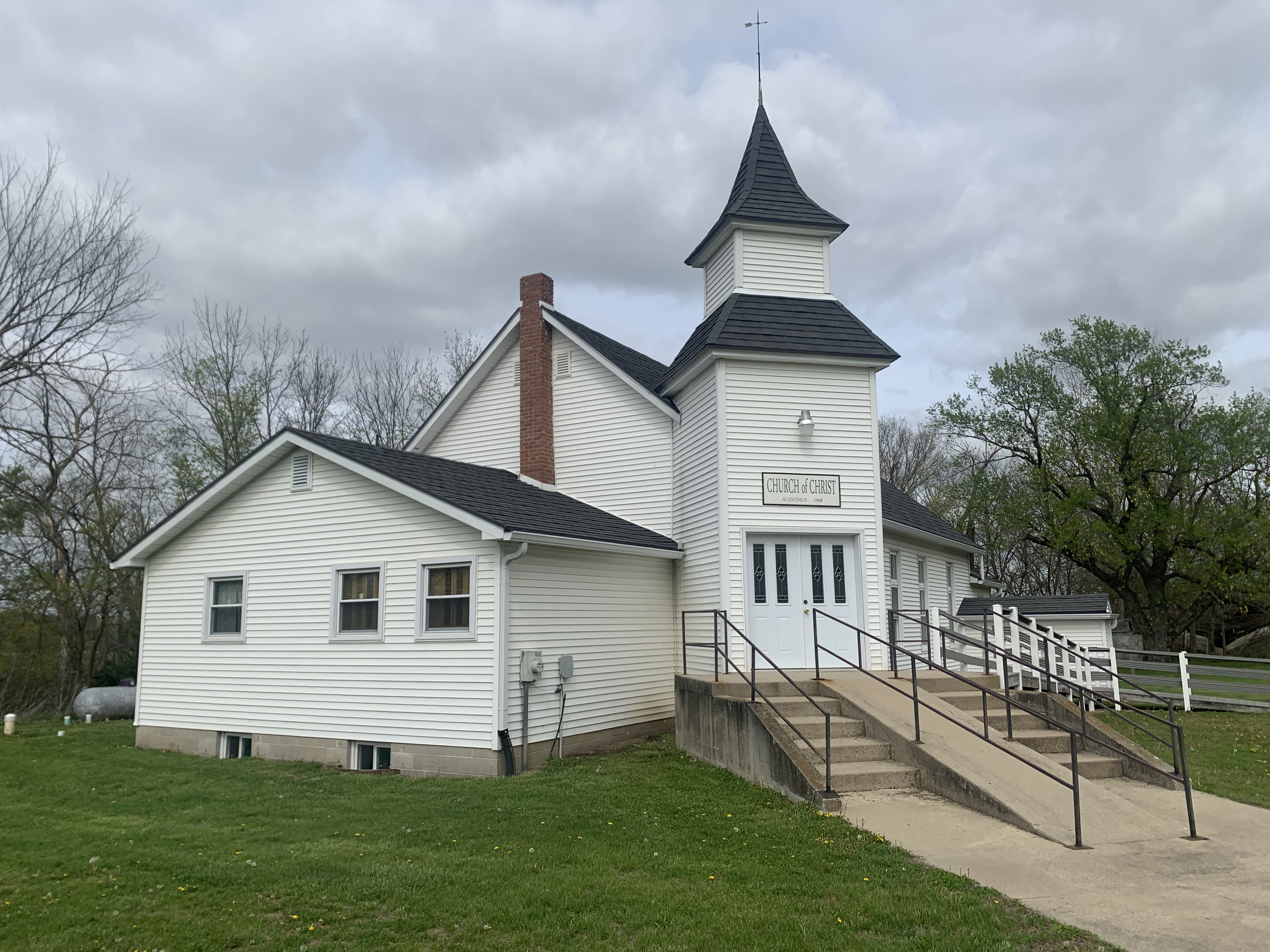
Alanthus Church of Christ in Alanthus Grove, April 2025

Alanthus Grove is an unincorporated community in northwest Gentry County, Missouri, United States.

The community is on Missouri Route B approximately six miles (9.7 km) north of Stanberry. The Grand River flows past one-half of mile (0.80 km) to the east.

== History ==
A post office called Alanthus Grove was established in 1855, and remained in operation until 1906. The community most likely was named for a grove of ailanthus trees near the original town site, and the hamlet has been denoted as this.

In 1925, Alanthus Grove had 104 inhabitants.
