= Fara Filiorum Petri =

- Comune
- Comune di Fara Filiorum Petri
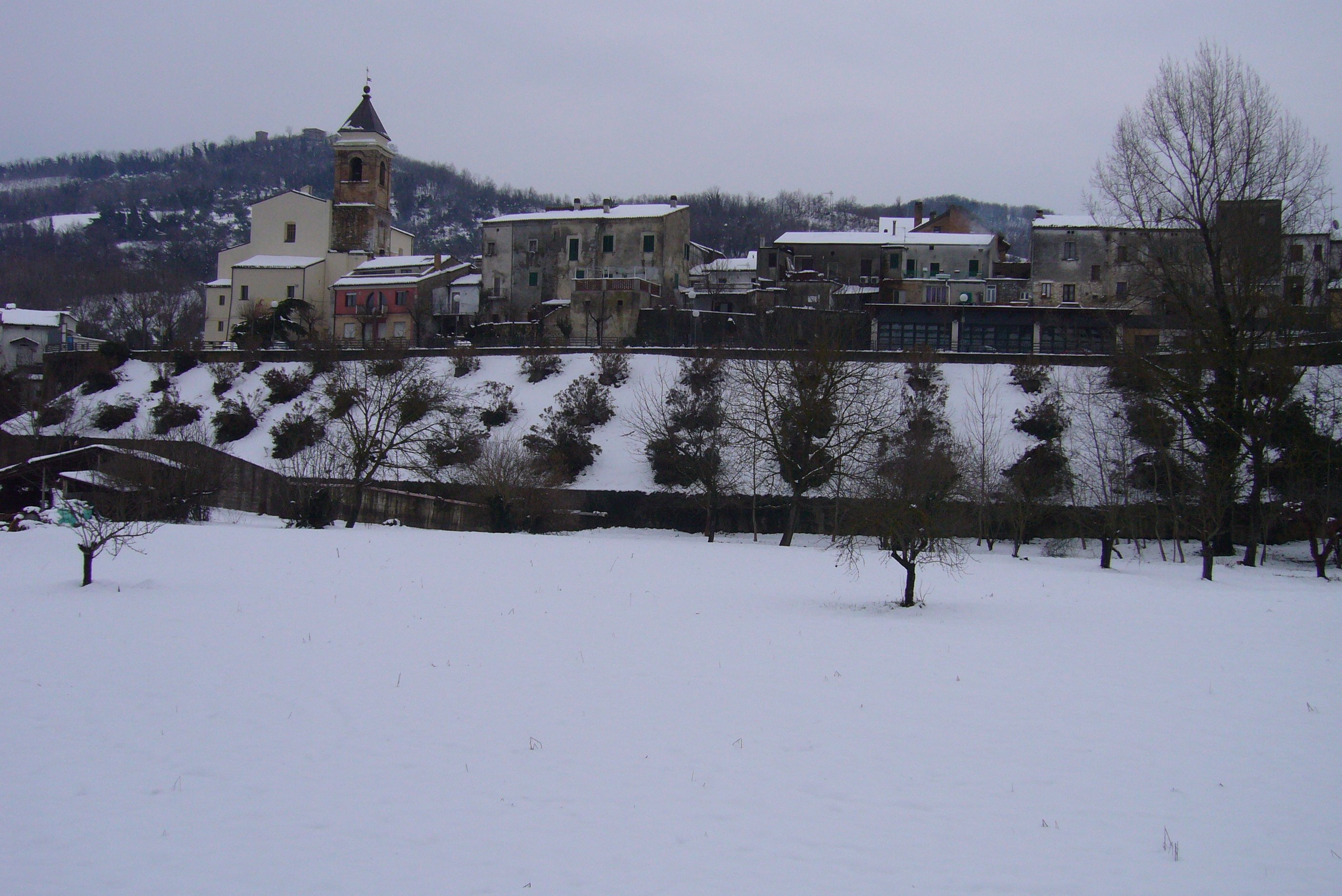

- Location within Italy Location within Abruzzo
- Coordinates: 42°14′59″N 14°11′12″E
- Country: Italy
- Region: Abruzzo
- Province: Chieti (CH)

Government
  - Mayor: Camillo D'Onofrio

Area
  - Total: 14.96 km^{2} (5.78 sq mi)
- Elevation: 227 m (745 ft)

Population (28 February 2017)
  - Total: 1,976
  - Density: 132.1/km^{2} (342.1/sq mi)
- Demonym: Faresi
- Time zone: UTC+1 (CET)
  - Summer (DST): UTC+2 (CEST)
- Postal code: 66010
- Dialing code: 0871
- Patron saint: St. Anthony the Abbot
- Saint day: 17 January
- Website: Official website

Fara Filiorum Petri (locally La Farë) is a comune and town in the province of Chieti in the Abruzzo region of southern Italy.

== See also ==
- Farchie Festival
