= Ruth Teitelbaum =

American computer programmer and mathematician

- Born: Ruth Lichterman; February 1, 1924; New York City, US
- Died: August 9, 1986 (aged 62); Dallas, Texas, US
- Education: Hunter College
- Occupation: Computer programmer
- Employer(s): Moore School of Electrical Engineering, University of Pennsylvania
- Known for: Programmed on the first all-electronic digital computer (ENIAC)
- Awards: Women in Technology International Hall of Fame

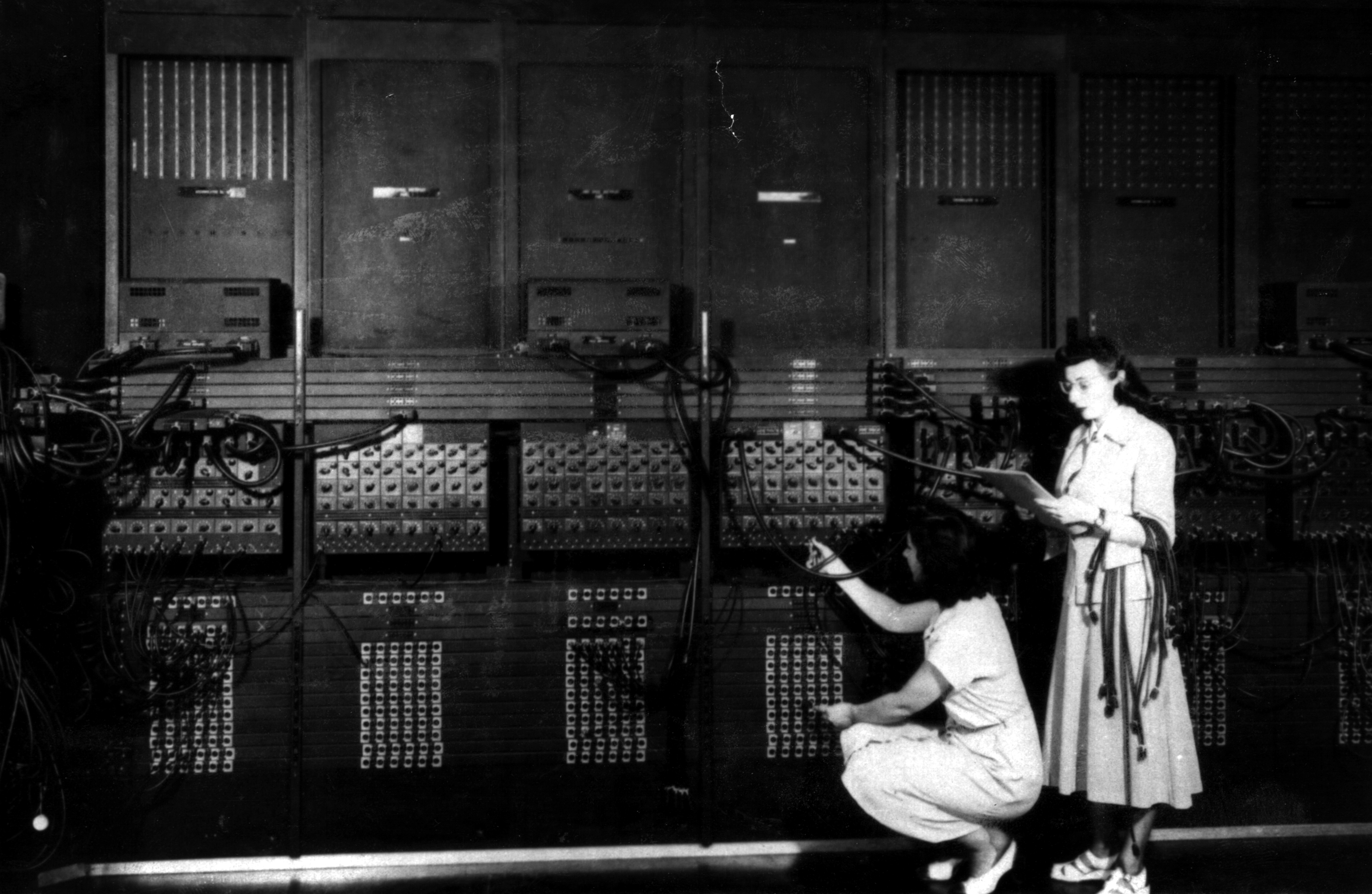
Programmers Gloria Gordon Bolotsky (crouching) and Ester Gerston (standing) wiring the right side of the ENIAC with a new program.

Ruth Teitelbaum (née Lichterman; February 1, 1924 – August 9, 1986) was an American computer programmer and mathematician who was one of the first computer programmers in the world. Teitelbaum was one of the original programmers for the ENIAC computer.

The other five ENIAC programmers were Jean Bartik, Betty Holberton, Kathleen Antonelli, Marlyn Meltzer, and Frances Spence.

== Early life and education ==
Teitelbaum was born Ruth Lichterman in The Bronx, New York, on February 1, 1924. She was the elder of two children, and the only daughter, of Sarah and Simon Lichterman, a teacher. Her parents were Jewish immigrants from Russia. She graduated from Hunter College with a B.Sc. in Mathematics.

== Career ==
Teitelbaum was hired by the Moore School of Electrical Engineering at the University of Pennsylvania to compute ballistics trajectories. The Moore School was funded by the US Army during the Second World War. Here, a group of about 80 women worked through complex differential calculations and manually calculated the trajectories.

In June 1943, the Army decided to fund an experimental project - the first all-electronic digital computer called the Electronic Numerical Integrator and Computer (ENIAC). The computer was a huge machine with 40 black 8-foot panels. The programmers had to physically program it using 3000 switches, and telephone switching cords in a dozen trays, to route the data, and the program, through the machine. This is the reason why these women were called "computers".

Along with Marlyn Meltzer, Teitelbaum was part of a special area of the ENIAC project to calculate ballistic trajectory equations using analog technology. They taught themselves and others certain functions of the ENIAC and helped prepare the ballistics software. In 1946, the ENIAC computer was unveiled before the public and the press. The women made a salary of $1,620 a year and were the only generation of programmers to work on the ENIAC.

After the war, Teitelbaum traveled with ENIAC to the Ballistics Research Laboratory at the Aberdeen Proving Ground where she remained for two more years to train the next group of ENIAC programmers.

== Legacy ==
In 2010, a documentary called, "Top Secret Rosies: The Female "Computers" of WWII" was released. The film centered around in-depth interviews of three of the six women programmers, focusing on the commendable patriotic contributions they made during World War II.

The ENIAC Programmers (As Told By U.S. Chief Technology Officer Megan Smith)

The ENIAC team is the inspiration behind the award-winning 2013 documentary The Computers. This documentary, created by Kathy Kleiman and the ENIAC Programmers Project, combines actual footage of the ENIAC team from the 1940s with interviews with the female team members as they reflect on their time working together on the ENIAC. It is the first documentary of a series of three, and parts two and three will be entitled The Coders and The Future-Maker, respectively.

== Personal life ==
She married Adolph Teitelbaum. The marriage license was issued on September 17, 1948.

=== Death ===
Ruth Teitelbaum died in 1986 at age 62 in Dallas, Texas.

== See also ==
- Kathleen Antonelli
- Jean Bartik
- Betty Holberton
- Frances Spence
- Marlyn Meltzer
- Timeline of women in science
