= Gloria Bolotsky =

American computer scientist

- Born: Gloria Ruth Gordon; July 28, 1921; New York City, New York, United States
- Died: June 30, 2009 (aged 87); Gaithersburg, Maryland, United States
- Education: Brooklyn College; University of Pennsylvania
- Spouse: Max Bolotsky (m. 1948-1998)
- Children: 5
- Scientific career
- Fields: Computer networking
- Workplaces: Aberdeen Proving Ground; National Bureau of Standards

Gloria Ruth Bolotsky (née Gordon; July 28, 1921 – June 30, 2009) was an American computer scientist, one of the early programmers of the ENIAC computer.

== Early life ==
Gloria Ruth Gordon was born in New York City on July 28 1921. She attended a nursing school, but eventually graduated with a degree in mathematics from Brooklyn College.

She married Max Bolotsky in 1948 and used his surname thereafter.

== Career ==
Gordon worked at the Brooklyn Navy Yard as a mathematician before moving to Philadelphia to join the University of Pennsylvania's engineering school in the 1940s. She was part of a team of around a hundred scientists who participated in the programming of the ENIAC computer, which was designed to calculate artillery firing tables for the US Army. The initial programming had been done by six women.

In 1946, Life magazine published a photograph of the ENIAC with two women working on it. Although the women were not identified at the time, the woman crouching was later revealed to be Gordon, while the other one was co-worker Esther Gerston.

From Philadelphia, she was hired to a secret group at the Aberdeen Proving Ground in Maryland in 1947. In the 1950s, Gloria Bolotsky worked as a high school mathematics teacher in Towson for a year. In 1963, she joined the National Bureau of Standards in Gaithersburg, where she worked for the next twenty years. Her contributions included computer networking, embedding networks in telecommunications systems, and cost optimization techniques.

== Personal life ==
Gloria Ruth Gordon married Max Bolotsky, a metallurgist, in 1948. They raised their family in Rockville, Maryland. They had five daughters. Bolotsky was widowed in 1998 after forty-nine years of marriage. She died of cancer on June 30, 2009, in Gaithersburg, Maryland, aged 87. She was interred at King David Memorial Gardens, Falls Church, Virginia.

== Selected publications ==
- Saltman, R. G.; Bolotsky, Gloria R.; Ruthberg, Zella G. (1973). Heuristic cost optimization of the federal telpak network. U.S. National Bureau of Standards.
- Orceyre, Michel J.; Courtney, Robert H.; Bolotsky, Gloria R. (1978). Considerations in the selection of security measures for automatic data processing systems. U.S. Dept. of Commerce, National Bureau of Standards.
- Collica, Joseph; Skall, Mark; Bolotsky, Gloria R. (1980). Conversion of federal ADP systems: a tutorial. U.S. Dept. of Commerce, National Bureau of Standards.
