= Top Secret Rosies: The Female "Computers" of WWII =

- Written by: Cynthia Baughman
- Directed by: LeAnn Erickson
- Country of origin: United States
- Original language: English

Production
- Producers: LeAnn Erickson; Kenneth Erickson; Sarack Erickson; Sandy Kyrish

Original release
- Release: November 1, 2010

Top Secret Rosies: The Female "Computers" of WWII is a 2010 documentary film directed by LeAnn Erickson. The film is focused on recognizing the contributions of American women serving as human computers during WWII, six of whom went on to program one of the earliest computers, the ENIAC. Their work helped the United States improve the accuracy of weaponry as most conducted ballistics analysis. The film officially premiered on November 1, 2010, on PBS.

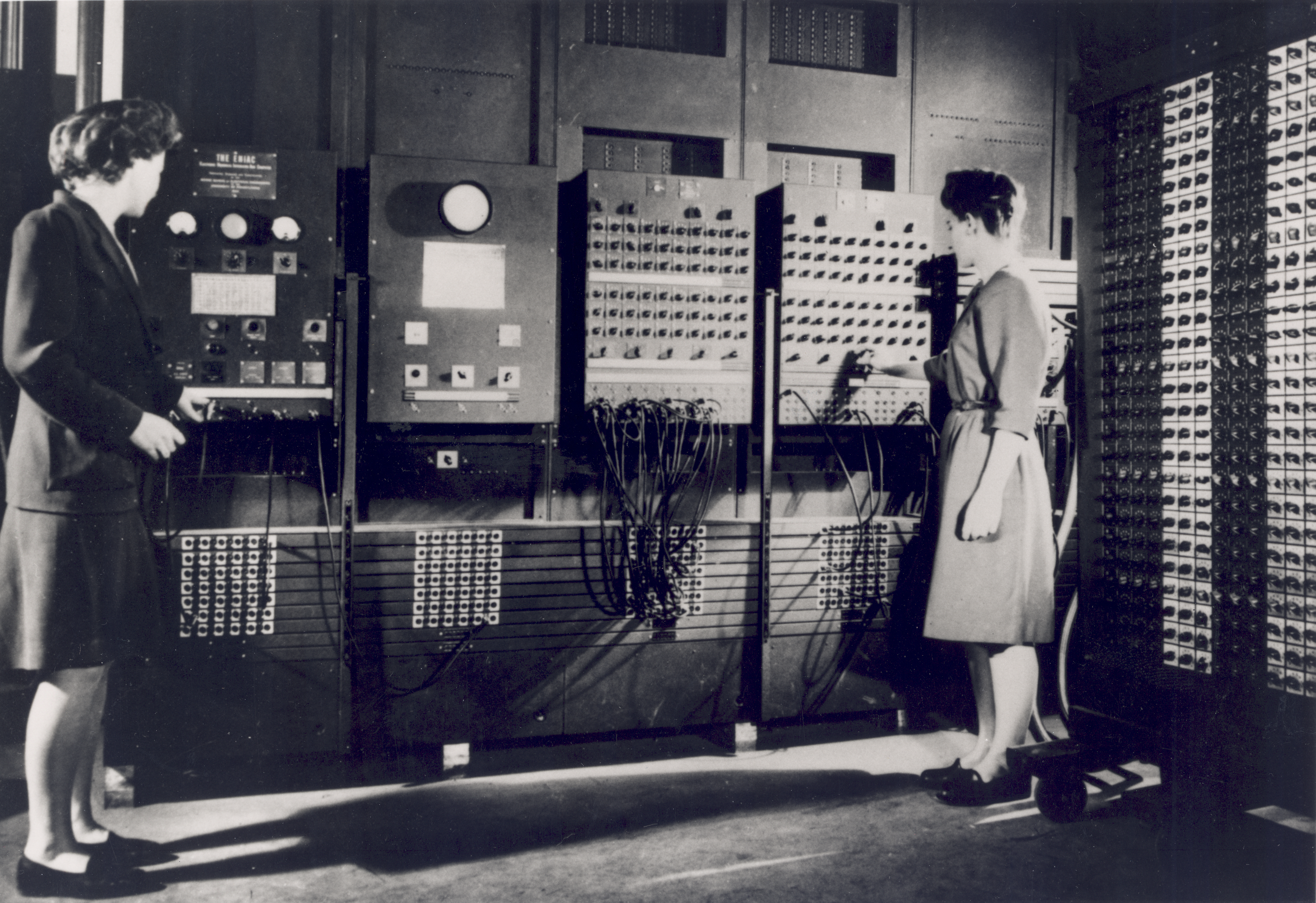
Two women operating the ENIAC's main control panel while the machine was still located at the Moore School. "U.S. Army Photo" from the archives of the ARL Technical Library. Left: Betty Jennings (Mrs. Bartik), right: Frances Bilas (Mrs. Spence).

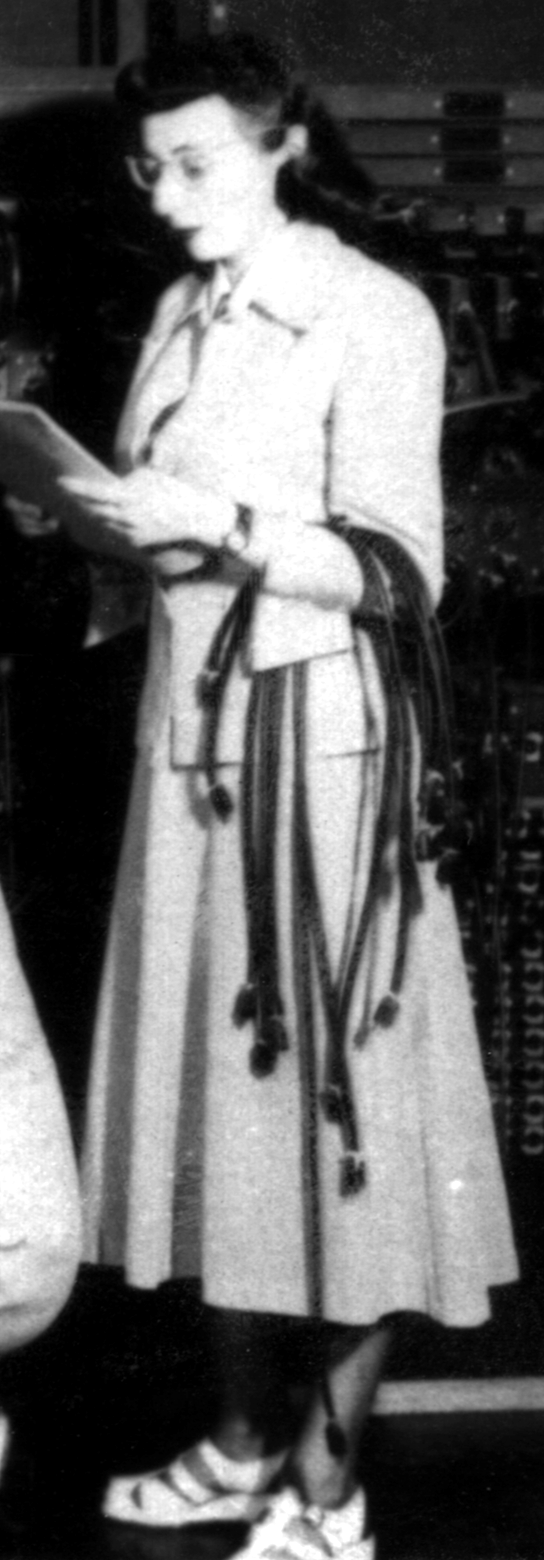
Esther Gersten working on the ENIAC (1946)

== History ==
At the time, in the 1940s, when these women were doing this work, it was considered classified; moreover, contemporaries considered programming a clerical task. Because of this, and because of their invisibility during the media coverage of ENIAC, the work of these women was largely unrecognized. Herman Goldstine selected the programmers from women who had been calculating ballistics tables with desk calculators and a differential analyzer prior to and during the development of ENIAC. Under Herman and Adele Goldstine's direction, the programmers studied ENIAC's blueprints and physical structure to determine how to manipulate its switches and cables, rather than learning a programming language, which had not yet been invented. According to Jamie Gumbrecht in an article by CNN:

They handed out its punch cards as souvenirs. They'd taught the massive machine do math that would've taken hours by hand. [...] But their work during the war was little known, unacknowledged or left out of official histories of the war and the development of computers.

The film focuses on the contributions of several women, namely the Blumberg twins, Doris Polsky (née Blumberg) and Shirley Melvin (née Blumberg); Marlyn Meltzer (née Wescoff); and Jean Bartik (a.k.a. Billie Jean Jennings). Kathleen Antonelli (née McNulty) is another ENIAC computer programmer recognized in the film. It has been taught widely in schools and universities and is credited for recognizing the little-known contributions of classified women technology workers during World War II and making that history available to public audiences. In the publication for American Association of University Women (AAUW), Erickson stated that the film is held in over 500 libraries worldwide.

In 2015 the film was adapted for the iPad in an interactive book app, The Computer Wore Heels. The app allows users to follow key figures from the film, and it highlights social issues, the day-to-day experience or working long shifts, and the wartime context.

== Reception ==
The film has received largely positive reviews, and primarily among educational or library organizations.

In their review of the film, the Mathematical Association of America wrote:

This story would be of enormous value in courses in women’s studies, the history of computing and technology, the history of World War II, and the history of mathematics. [...] Fortunately, the video was made in the nick of time as two of the women interviewed have died since it was made.

Professor emeritus of mathematics at Marymount University, Judy Green, took issue with the film, however, for its limited view of history, suggesting that the narrative scope skews the history of women in mathematics:

While things today are better for women, mathematicians and others, than they were in the 1940s, it took awhile for the women of this film to be recognized. Nonetheless, many may come away from the film thinking that before World War II women not only did not work as computers or mathematicians but they also thought themselves incapable of doing such work. Listening to the four Rosies, one has the impression that such thoughts never entered their minds.

== See also ==
- List of documentary films about World War II
- Category:Bletchley Park women in the United Kingdom
