= Marlyn Meltzer =

Programmer for the ENIAC computer

- Marlyn Meltzer
- Born: 1922; Philadelphia, Pennsylvania, US
- Died: December 7, 2008 (aged 86); Yardley, Pennsylvania, US
- Education: Temple University
- Occupations: Computer Programmer, Mathematician
- Employer(s): Moore School of Electrical Engineering, University of Pennsylvania
- Honours: Women in Technology International Hall of Fame

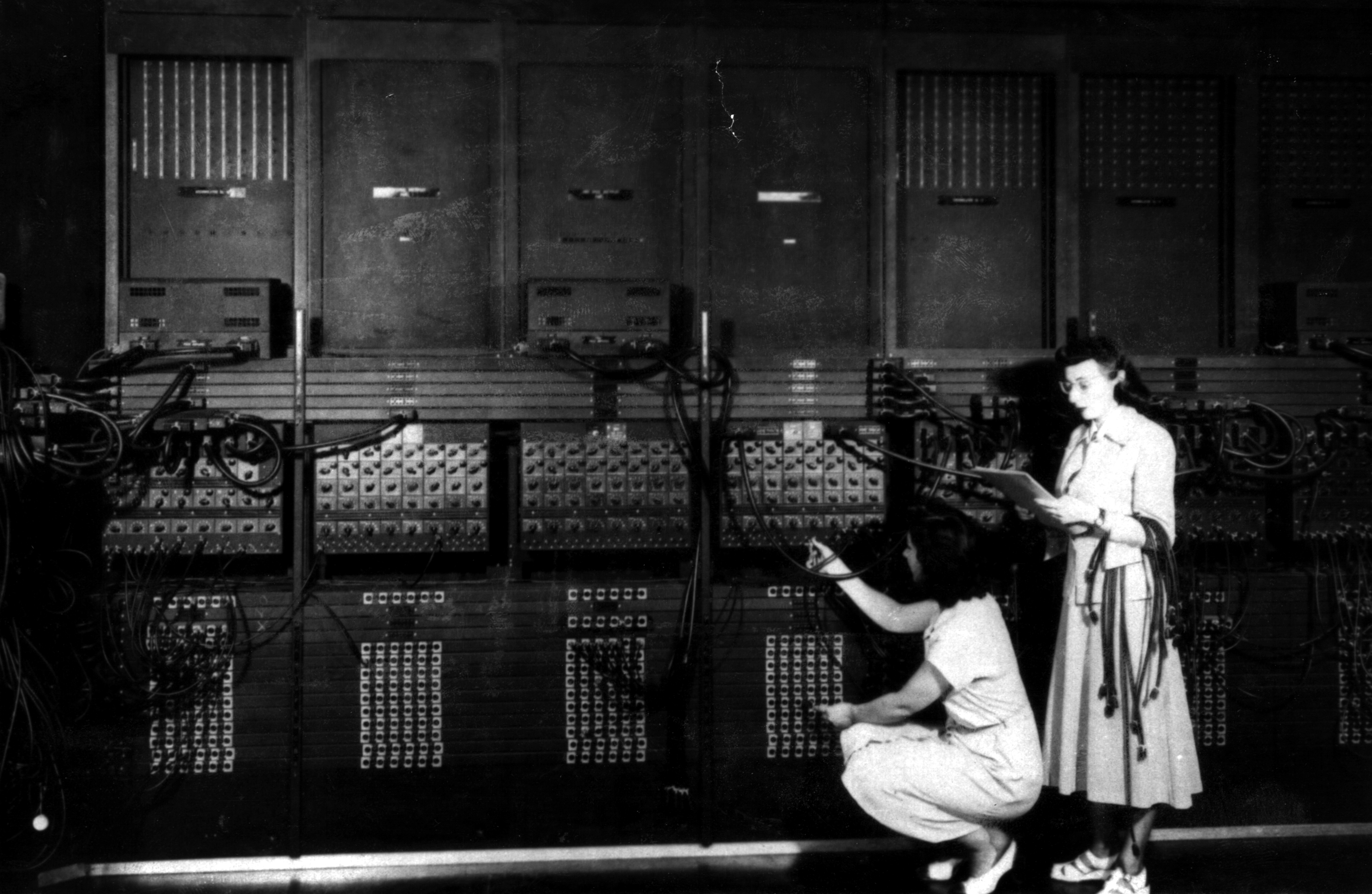
Programmers Gloria Gordon Bolotsky (crouching) and Ester Gerston (standing) wiring the right side of the ENIAC with a new program.

Marlyn Wescoff Meltzer (1922 – December 7, 2008) was an American mathematician and computer programmer, and one of the six original programmers of ENIAC, the first general-purpose electronic digital computer.

== Early life ==
Meltzer was born Marlyn Wescoff in Philadelphia in 1922. She graduated from Temple University in 1942.

== Career ==
Meltzer was hired by the Moore School of Engineering after graduating to perform weather calculations, mainly because she knew how to operate an adding machine. In 1943, she was hired to perform calculations for ballistics trajectories. At the time, this was accomplished by using manual desktop mechanical calculators. In 1945, she was selected to become one of the 6 original programmers of Electronic Numerical Integrator and Computer (ENIAC).

=== ENIAC ===
Meltzer, alongside Kathleen Antonelli, Jean Jennings Bartik, Frances Elizabeth Holberton, Frances Spence and Ruth Teitelbaum, were the original six programmers of ENIAC, a project that originally began in secret at the Moore School of Electrical Engineering at the University of Pennsylvania in 1943.

ENIAC was a huge machine full of black panels and switches, containing 17,468 vacuum tubes, 7,200 crystal diodes, 1500 relays, 70,000 resistors, 10,000 capacitors and approximately 5,000,000 hand-soldered joints. It weighed more than 30 short tons, occupied 167m2 and consumed 150 kW of electricity. Its huge power requirement led to a rumor that the lights across Philadelphia would dim every time it was switched on.

ENIAC was unveiled to the public on February 14, 1946, making headlines across the country.

Although mentioned in Woman of the ENIAC at the time, little recognition was attributed to the women working on the computer, with attention focused on the male engineers who built the machine. Meltzer resigned from the team in 1947 to get married before ENIAC was relocated to the Aberdeen Proving Grounds.

In 1997, Meltzer was inducted into the Women in Technology International Hall of Fame, along with the other original ENIAC programmers. This award was established in 1996 by WITI to "recognize, honor, and promote the outstanding contributions women make to the scientific and technological communities that improve and evolve our society".

=== Volunteer work ===
Meltzer enjoyed volunteering at Shir Ami Library and Sunday school story hour. She also delivered Meals on Wheels for more than 10 years for the Greenwood House in Ewing, NJ. She was the treasurer of the Trenton/Lawrenceville chapter of Hadassah and an active member of Women for Greenwood House.

During her last four years, she had knitted more than 500 chemotherapy hats for Susan B. Komen For the Cure, a non-profit organization in Philadelphia.

== Death ==
Meltzer died on December 7, 2008, in Yardley, Bucks County, Pennsylvania, United States.

== Legacy ==
The ENIAC Programmers (As Told By U.S. Chief Technology Officer Megan Smith)

In 1997 she was inducted into the Women in Technology International Hall of Fame, along with the other original ENIAC programmers.

Her work on ENIAC and at the University of Pennsylvania was later recognized in the 2010 documentary film Top Secret Rosies: The Female "Computers" of WWII.

The ENIAC team is also the inspiration behind the award-winning 2013 documentary The Computers. This documentary, created by Kathy Kleiman and the ENIAC Programmers Project, combines actual footage of the ENIAC team from the 1940s with interviews with the female team members as they reflect on their time working together on the ENIAC.

== See also ==
- Timeline of women in science
