= Betty Holberton =

American computer scientist (1917–2001)

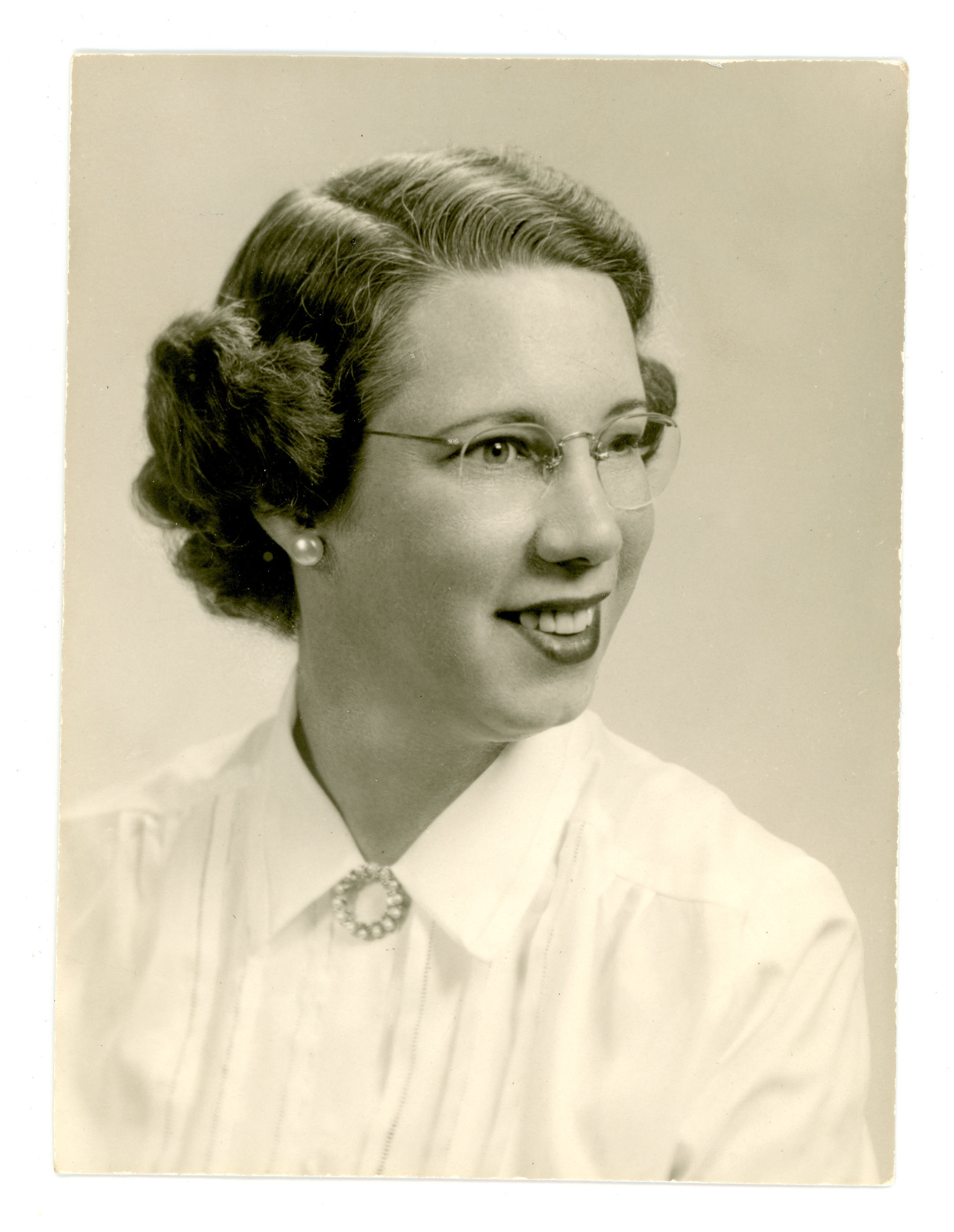
- Holberton, c. 1955
- Born: Frances Elizabeth Snyder; March 7, 1917; Philadelphia, Pennsylvania, U.S.
- Died: December 8, 2001 (aged 84); Rockville, Maryland, U.S.
- Education: University of Pennsylvania
- Occupation: Computer scientist
- Employers: Moore School of Engineering; University of Pennsylvania Remington Rand; National Bureau of Standards David Taylor Model Basin
- Known for: ENIAC
- Spouse: John Vaughan Holberton
- Children: 2
- Awards: Department of Commerce Silver Medal (1976); Ada Lovelace Award (1997); IEEE Computer Pioneer Award (1997); WITI Hall of Fame (1997)

Frances Elizabeth Holberton (March 7, 1917 – December 8, 2001) was an American computer scientist who was one of the six original programmers of the first general-purpose electronic digital computer, ENIAC (Electronic Numerical Integrator And Computer). The other five ENIAC programmers were Jean Bartik, Ruth Teitelbaum, Kathleen Antonelli, Marlyn Meltzer, and Frances Spence.

Holberton invented breakpoints in computer debugging.

Holberton was the first person to write a program to write a program ie use a computer to write a program.

== Early life and education ==
Holberton was born Frances Elizabeth Snyder in Philadelphia, Pennsylvania in 1917. Her father was John Amos Snyder (1884–1963), her mother was Frances J. Morrow (1892–1981), and she was the third child in a family of eight children.

Holberton studied journalism, because its curriculum let her travel far afield. Journalism was also one of the few fields open to women as a career in the 1940s. She stated that on her first day of classes at the University of Pennsylvania, her math professor asked her if she wouldn't be better off at home raising children.

== Career ==
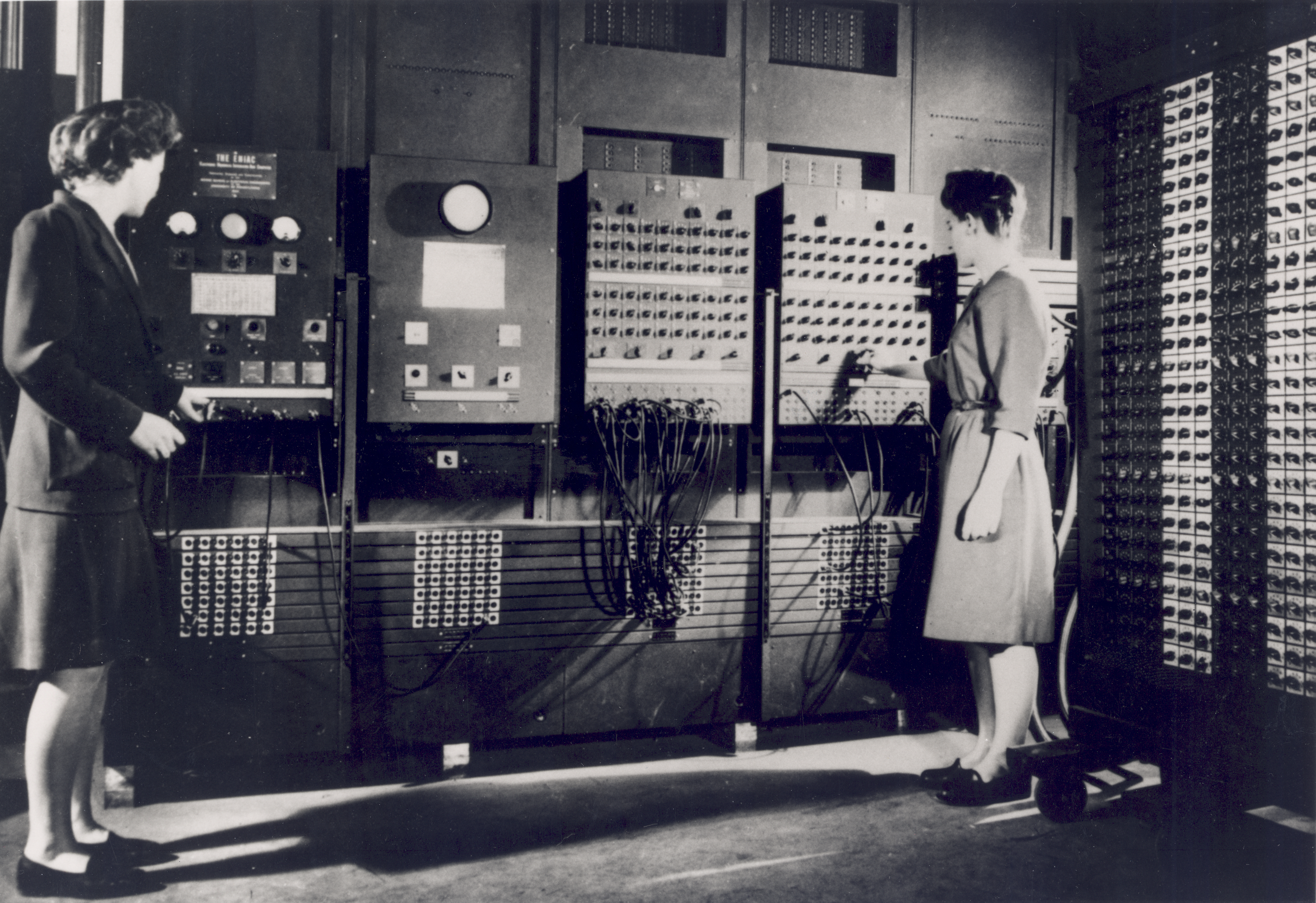
Programmers Betty Jean Jennings (left) and Fran Bilas (right) operating ENIAC's main control panel at the Moore School of Electrical Engineering, c. 1945 (U.S. Army photo from the archives of the ARL Technical Library)

The ENIAC Programmers (As Told By U.S. Chief Technology Officer Megan Smith)

During World War II, while the U.S. Army needed to compute ballistics trajectories, many women were interviewed for this task. At least 200 women were hired by the Moore School of Engineering to work as "computers" and six of them were chosen to be the programmers of ENIAC. Betty Holberton, Kay McNulty, Marlyn Wescoff, Ruth Lichterman, Betty Jean Jennings, and Fran Bilas programmed the ENIAC to perform calculations for ballistics trajectories electronically for the Army's Ballistic Research Laboratory. While men having the same education and experience were designated "professionals", these women were designated "subprofessionals", though they had professional degrees in mathematics and were highly trained mathematicians.

In the beginning, because the ENIAC was classified, the women were only allowed to work with blueprints and wiring diagrams in order to program it. During her time working on ENIAC, she had many productive ideas at night-time, leading other programmers to jokingly state that she "solved more problems in her sleep than other people did awake."

The ENIAC was unveiled on February 15, 1946, at the University of Pennsylvania. It cost around $487,000, equivalent to $9,061,000 in 2025.

After World War II, Holberton worked at Remington Rand and the National Bureau of Standards. She was the Chief of the Programming Research Branch, Applied Mathematics Laboratory at the David Taylor Model Basin in 1959. She helped to develop the UNIVAC, designing control panels that put the numeric keypad next to the keyboard and persuading engineers to replace the Univac's black exterior with the gray-beige tone that came to be the universal color of computers.

According to Captain Grace Hopper, who worked with Betty Holberton, she never received the credit that she should have for the work she did. "Everybody’s forgotten that she wrote the first program that wrote a program. She wrote that sort-merge generator, and what she did was feed in the specs for the data you were handling and the keys and that sort of thing, and then it generated the sort program for that specific data. That’s the first time to my knowledge that anyone used the computer to write a program."

She was one of those who wrote the first generative programming system (SORT/MERGE). Holberton used a deck of playing cards to develop the decision tree for the binary sort function, and wrote the code to employ a group of ten tape drives to read and write data as needed during the process. She wrote the first statistical analysis package, which was used for the 1950 US Census.

In 1953 she was made a supervisor of advanced programming in a part of the Navy's Applied Math lab in Maryland, where she stayed until 1966. Holberton worked with John Mauchly to develop the C-10 instruction set for BINAC, which is considered to be the prototype of all modern programming languages. She also participated in the development of early standards for the COBOL and FORTRAN programming languages with Grace Hopper. Later, as an employee of the National Bureau of Standards, she was very active in the first two revisions of the Fortran language standard ("FORTRAN 77" and "Fortran 90").

== Death ==
She died on December 8, 2001, in Rockville, Maryland, aged 84, of heart disease, diabetes, and complications from a stroke she had suffered several years before. She was survived by her husband John Vaughn Holberton and her daughters Pamela and Priscilla.

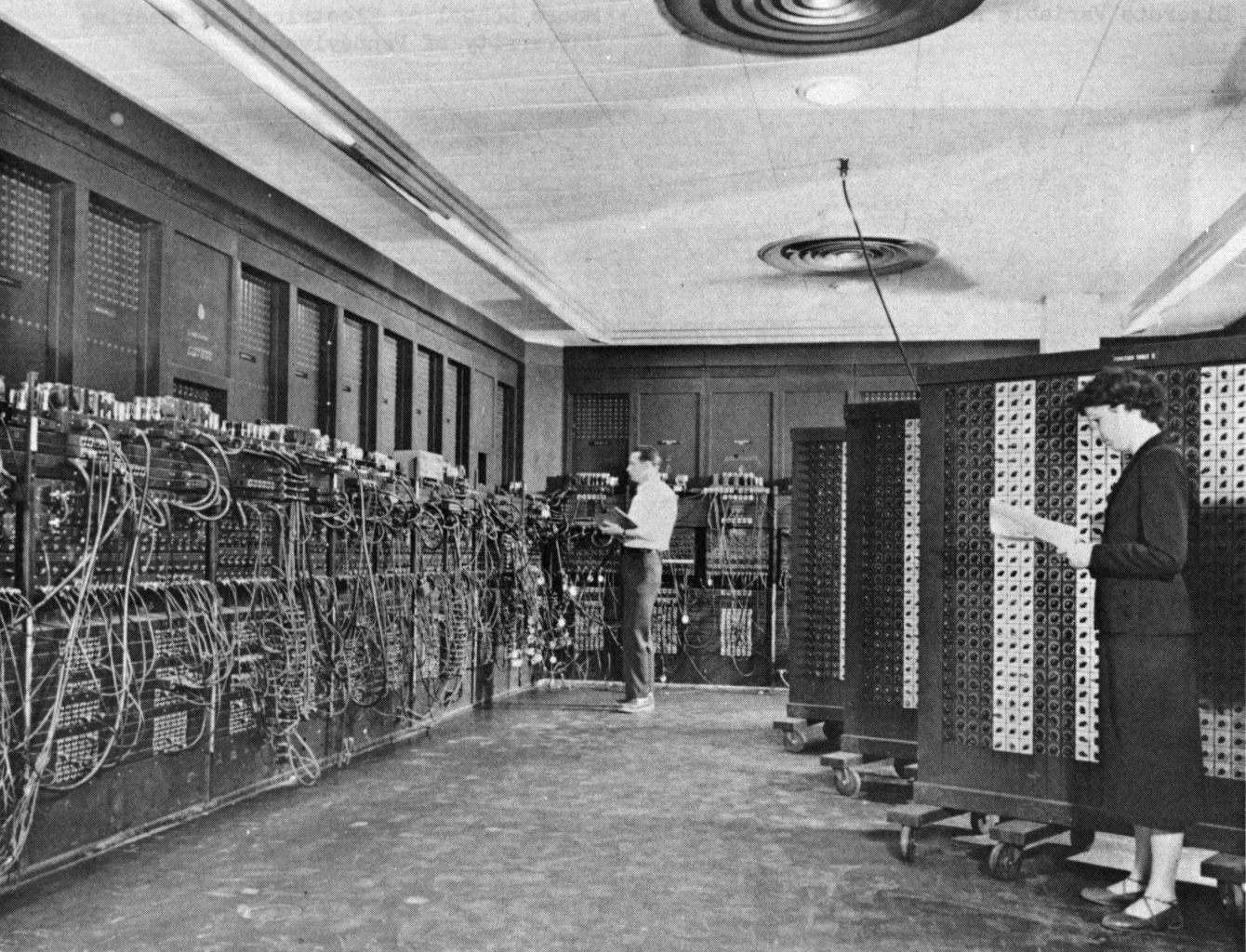
Betty Holberton (right foreground) programming the ENIAC computer in Philadelphia, Pennsylvania, BRL building 328 (1940s/1950s)

== Awards ==
Holberton was awarded with a Department of Commerce Silver Medal in recognition of her work on revision of the national standard for FORTRAN and the development of test routines to test compliance.

In 1997, she was the only woman of the original six who programmed the ENIAC to receive the Augusta Ada Lovelace Award, the highest award given by the Association of Women in Computing.

That same year, she received the IEEE Computer Pioneer Award from the IEEE Computer Society for developing the sort/merge generator which, according to IEEE, "inspired the first ideas about compilation."

Also in 1997, she was inducted into the Women in Technology International Hall of Fame, along with the other original ENIAC programmers.

== Legacy ==
The Holberton School, a project-based school for software engineers based in San Francisco, was founded in her honor in 2015.

In 2010, a documentary called, Top Secret Rosies: The Female "Computers" of WWII was released. The film centered around in-depth interviews of three of the six women programmers, focusing on the commendable patriotic contributions they made during World War II.

The ENIAC team is the inspiration behind the award-winning 2013 documentary The Computers. This documentary, created by Kathy Kleiman and the ENIAC Programmers Project, combines actual footage of the ENIAC team from the 1940s with interviews with the female team members as they reflect on their time working together on the ENIAC. It is the first documentary of a series of three, with the other two entitled The Coders and The Future-Maker, respectively.

== See also ==
- Women in Technology International
- Timeline of women in science
- List of pioneers in computer science
