= Moore School Lectures =

Course in the construction of electronic digital computers

Theory and Techniques for Design of Electronic Digital Computers (popularly called the "Moore School Lectures") was a course in the construction of electronic digital computers held at the University of Pennsylvania's Moore School of Electrical Engineering between July 8, 1946, and August 30, 1946, and was the first time any computer topics had ever been taught to an assemblage of people. The course disseminated the ideas developed for the EDVAC (then being built at the Moore School as the successor computer to the ENIAC) and initiated an explosion of computer construction activity in the United States and internationally, especially in the United Kingdom.

== Background ==
The Moore School in Philadelphia, Pennsylvania was at the center of developments in high-speed electronic computing in 1946. On February 14 of that year it had publicly unveiled the ENIAC, the first general-purpose electronic digital computer, developed in secret beginning in 1943 for the Army's Ballistics Research Laboratory. Prior even to the ENIAC's completion, work had begun on a second-generation electronic digital computer, the EDVAC, which incorporated the stored program model. Work at the Moore School attracted researchers including John von Neumann, who served as a consultant to the EDVAC project, and Stan Frankel and Nicholas Metropolis of the Manhattan Project, who arrived to run one of the first major programs written for the ENIAC, a mathematical simulation for the hydrogen bomb project.

World War II had spawned major national efforts in many forms of scientific research—continued in peacetime—that required computationally intensive analysis; the thirst for information about the new Moore School computing machines had not been slaked, but instead intensified, by the distribution of von Neumann's notes on the EDVAC's logical design. Rather than allow themselves to be inundated with requests for demonstrations or slow progress in computer research by withholding the benefits of the Moore School's expertise until papers could be published formally, the administration, including Dean Harold Pender, Prof. Carl Chambers, and Director of Research Irven Travis, respectively proposed, organized, and secured funding for what they envisioned as a lecture series for between 30 and 40 participants enrolled by select invitation.

The 8-week course was conducted under the auspices of the United States Army Ordnance Department and the U.S. Navy's Office of Naval Research, who promised (by verbal authorizations) the $3,000 requested to cover lecturer salaries and fees and $4,000 for travel, printing, and overhead. ($1,569 over this figure was ultimately claimed.)

Even as the Moore School found itself in the computing spotlight, its computer design team was disintegrating into splinter groups who hoped to advance computing research commercially, or academically at more prestigious institutions. In the former group were ENIAC co-inventors J. Presper Eckert and John Mauchly, who the previous March had departed the Moore School amidst a patent rights dispute to found the first computer company, the Electronic Control Company (later renamed to Eckert–Mauchly Computer Corporation), and took many on the Moore School staff with them; in the latter group were Herman Goldstine (the Army's liaison to the Moore School who served as administrative overseer of the ENIAC's construction) and Arthur Burks (a Moore School professor on the ENIAC design team), lured to the Institute for Advanced Study by von Neumann. Despite the somewhat acrimonious fracturing of the ENIAC/EDVAC group, these figures gave the majority of the Moore School Lectures, with Eckert and Mauchly receiving the highest salaries ($1,200 each), while Goldstine and the others received only travel expenses and an honorarium ($50 per lecture).

== Lecturers and lectures ==
Lectures were given 5 days a week on weekdays and were from 1 to 3 hours long with afternoons typically reserved for informal seminars.

Many of the pioneers of early computer development, especially those involved with ENIAC contributed to the Moore School Lectures, most prolifically Pres Eckert, followed by John Mauchly and Herman Goldstine. The topics covered virtually all facets of electronic computing relevant to the construction and operation of digital computers, and included, by popular demand, an unscheduled presentation of the ENIAC during the latter half of the sixth week and the first half of the seventh week, with lectures by Mauchly, Sharpless, and Chu. Discussions of the ENIAC were resisted since its logical design had been obsoleted even before its completion by ongoing work on the EDVAC with its stored-program concept; nevertheless, it was the only electronic digital computer then in operation and the students petitioned to see demonstrations and learn of its design.

=== From the Moore School team ===
- J. Presper Eckert of the Electronic Control Company:
  - "A Preview of a Digital Computing Machine" (July 15, 1946)
  - "Types of Circuits—General" (July 18, 1946)
  - "Reliability of Parts" (July 23, 1946)
  - "Adders" (July 26, 1946) (with Sheppard)
  - "Multipliers" (July 29, 1946)
  - "Tapetypers and Printing Mechanisms" (August 1, 1946)
  - "Continuous Variable Input and Output Devices" (August 6, 1946)
  - "Reliability and Checking" (August 7, 1946)
  - "Electrical Delay Lines" (August 14, 1946)
  - "A Parallel-Type EDVAC" (August 22, 1946)
  - "A Parallel Channel Computing Machine" (August 26, 1946)
- John W. Mauchly of the Electronic Control Company:
  - "Digital and Analogy Computing Machines" (July 8, 1946)
  - "The Use of Function Tables with Computing Machines" (July 12, 1946)
  - "Sorting and Collating" (July 25, 1946)
  - "Conversion Between Binary and Decimal Number Systems" (July 29, 1946)
  - "Code and Control II: Machine Design and Instruction Codes" (August 9, 1946)
  - "Introduction to the ENIAC" (August 15, 1946) (unscheduled)
  - "Block Diagrams of the ENIAC III" (August 20, 1946) (unscheduled)
  - "Accumulation of Errors in Numerical Methods" (August 30, 1946)
- Herman Goldstine of the Institute for Advanced Study, Princeton, New Jersey:
  - "Numerical Mathematical Methods I" (July 10, 1946)
  - "Numerical Mathematical Methods II" (July 11, 1946)
  - "Numerical Mathematical Methods III" (July 16, 1946)
  - "Numerical Mathematical Methods V" (July 22, 1946)
  - "Numerical Mathematical Methods VI" (July 30, 1946)
  - "Numerical Mathematical Methods VII" (August 2, 1946)
- Arthur W. Burks of the Institute for Advanced Study, Princeton, New Jersey:
  - "Digital Machine Functions" (July 12, 1946)
  - "Numerical Mathematical Methods IV" (July 22, 1946)
  - "Numerical Mathematical Methods VIII" (August 2, 1946)
- T. Kite Sharpless of the Moore School:
  - "Switching and Coupling Circuits" (July 19, 1946)
  - "Block Diagrams of the ENIAC I" (August 16, 1946) (unscheduled)
  - "Block Diagrams of the ENIAC II" (August 19, 1946) (unscheduled)
  - "Description of Serial Acoustic Binary EDVAC I" (August 28, 1946)
  - "Description of Serial Acoustic Binary EDVAC II" (August 28, 1946)
- Jeffrey Chuan Chu of the Moore School:
  - "Magnetic Recording" (July 31, 1946)
  - "Block Diagrams of the ENIAC IV" (August 21, 1946) (unscheduled)
- C. Bradford Sheppard of the Moore School:
  - "Elements of a Complete Computing System" (July 15, 1946)
  - "Adders" (July 26, 1946) (with Eckert)
  - "Memory Devices" (July 24, 1946)
  - "Code and Control I" (August 8, 1946) (filling in for Eckert)
  - "Code and Control III" (scheduled but not given)
  - "A Four-Channel Coded-Decimal Electrostatic Machine" (August 27, 1946)
- Irven Travis of the Moore School:
  - "The History of Computing Devices" (July 8, 1946)
- Sam B. Willams, consultant to the Moore School:
  - "Reliability and Checking in Digital Computing Systems" (August 7, 1946)

=== From the University of Pennsylvania ===
- Hans Rademacher:
  - "On the Accumulation of Errors in Numerical Integration on the ENIAC" (July 22, 1946)

=== From Harvard University ===
- Howard Aiken:
  - "The Automatic Sequence Controlled Calculator" (July 16, 1946)
  - "Electro-Mechanical Tables of the Elementary Functions" (July 17, 1946)

=== From the U.S. Navy Office of Research and Inventions ===
- Perry Crawford, Jr.:
  - "Applications of Digital Computation Involving Continuous Input and Output Variables" (August 5, 1946)

=== From the National Bureau of Standards ===
- John H. Curtiss:
  - "A Review of Government Requirements and Activities in the Field of Automatic Digital Computing Machinery" (August 1, 1946)

=== From the University of California, Berkeley ===
- Derrick H. Lehmer:
  - "Computing Machines for Pure Mathematics" (July 9, 1946)

=== From the University of Manchester, England ===
- Douglas Hartree:
  - "Some General Considerations in the Solutions of Problems in Applied Mathematics" (July 9, 1946)

=== From RCA ===
- Jan Rajchman:
  - "The Selectron" (August 23, 1946)

=== From the Naval Ordnance Laboratory ===
- Calvin N. Mooers:
  - "Code and Control IV: Examples of a Three-Address Code and the Use of 'Stop Order Tags'" (August 12, 1946)
  - "Discussions of Ideas for the Naval Ordnance Laboratory Computing Machine" (August 26, 1946)

=== From the Institute for Advanced Study ===
- John von Neumann:
  - "New Problems and Approaches" (August 13, 1946)

=== Independent consultant ===
- George Stibitz:
  - "Introduction to the Course on Electronic Computers" (July 8, 1946)

The initial plan for the lectures, outlined by Chambers in a June 28, 1946, memorandum, was for them to be grouped into four major headings, with the second and third being presented concurrently after the completion of the first: General Introduction to Computing, covering the history, types, and uses of computing devices; Machine Elements, focusing on hardware and, indeed, software, under the term "code and control"; Detailed Study of Mathematics of Problems, what today might constitute a course in programming, including the Goldstine/Burks lectures on numerical mathematical methods and Mauchly's lectures on sorting, decimal-binary conversion and error accumulation; and finally a series of lectures on overall machine design called Final Detailed Presentation of Three Machines, though it actually came to include six machines, including the ENIAC, which despite its fame had not been an intended focus of any of the lectures.

The actual record of the lectures is incomplete. While many of the lectures were recorded on a wire recorder by Herman Lukoff and Dick Merwin, the recorder frequently broke down mid-lecture, and the recordings took several months to be transcribed and proofed by the lecturers. It wasn't until two years after the lectures, in 1948, that all of the material was assembled and published in four volumes edited by the Moore School's George W. Patterson, who was on the EDVAC staff. Some of the gaps have since been filled in with the notes of student Frank M. Verzuh.

== Students ==
28 students were invited to attend the Moore School Lectures, each a veteran engineer or mathematician:

- Sam N. Alexander, Edward W. Cannon, and Roger Curtis of the National Bureau of Standards
- Mark Breiter of the War Department's Office of the Chief of Ordnance
- Arthur B. Horton, Warren S. Loud, and Lou D. Wilson of MIT
- David R. Brown and Robert R. Everett of the MIT Servomechanisms Laboratory
- Frank M. Verzuh of MIT's Rockefeller Electronic Computer Project
- Howard L. Clark and G.W. Hobbs of General Electric Co.
- R.D. Elbourne of the Naval Ordnance Laboratory, who worked for John Vincent Atanasoff
- Herbert Galman and Joshua Rosenbloom of the Frankford Arsenal
- Orin P. Gard of Wright Field's Armament Laboratory
- Simon E. Gluck of the Moore School
- D.H. Gridley and Louis Suss of the Naval Research Laboratory
- Samuel Lubkin of Aberdeen Proving Ground's Ballistics Research Laboratory
- James T. Pendergrass of the OP-20-G CNO Navy Department
- David Rees of Manchester University, England
- Albert Sayre of the Army Security Agency
- Phillip A. Shaffer, Jr. of the Naval Ordnance Testing Station, Pasadena, California
- Claude E. Shannon of Bell Telephone Laboratories
- Albert E. Smith of the Navy Office of Research and Inventions
- Maurice V. Wilkes of Cambridge University, who joined the course only for its final two weeks after numerous problems with his travel
- H.I. Zagor of the Reeves Instrument Company

Uninvited attendees saw at least some of the lectures:

- Cuthbert Hurd of Allegheny College
- Jay Forrester of MIT
- Unidentified representatives of the MIT Servomechanisms Laboratory who took the place of Brown and Everett on any given week

Additionally, many of the lecturers attended a number of the lectures by others.

The individuals and institutions represented at the Moore School Lectures went on to be involved with numerous successful computer construction projects in the late 1940s and early 1950s, including EDSAC, BINAC, UNIVAC, CALDIC, SEAC and SWAC, the IAS machine, and the Whirlwind.

The success of the Moore School Lectures prompted Harvard University to host the first computer conference in January, 1947; that same year the Association for Computing Machinery was founded as a professional society to organize future conferences.
