= Harold Pender Award =

American engineering award

The Harold Pender Award, initiated in 1972 and named after founding Dean Harold Pender, is given by the Faculty of the School of Engineering and Applied Science of the University of Pennsylvania to an outstanding member of the engineering profession who has achieved distinction by significant contributions to society. The Pender Award is the School of Engineering's highest honor.

== Past recipients ==
- 2018: Yann LeCun, for his work in convolutional neural networks.
- 2013: Barbara Liskov, for her work in programming languages, programming methodology and distributed systems.
- 2010: Robert E. Kahn and Vinton G. Cerf, for their pioneering and seminal contributions to network-based information technology, and especially for the design and implementation of the TCP/IP protocol suite, which continues to provide the foundation for the growing Internet
- 2006: Mildred Dresselhaus, for pioneering contributions and leadership in the field of carbon-based nanostructures and nanotechnology, and for promoting opportunities for women in science and engineering
- 2003: Dennis Ritchie and Ken Thompson, for development of the UNIX operating system and C programming language
- 2002: John J. Hopfield, for his pioneering accomplishments in the field of computational neuroscience and neuroengineering
- 2000: Jack St. Clair Kilby, for his contribution to the invention of the integrated circuit, or microchip
- 1999: John H. Holland, founder of genetic algorithms and innovative research in the science of complexity and adaptation
- 1995: George Dantzig, developer of the simplex algorithm spawning the field of linear programming
- 1993: Hiroshi Inose, leader in advances in digital communication and in increasing our understanding of the effects of information flow on society
- 1991: Arno Penzias, discoverer of the background microwave blackbody radiation of the universe
- 1990: Dana S. Scott, pioneer in application of concepts from logic and algebra to the development of mathematical semantics of programming languages
- 1989: Leo Esaki, pioneer in tunneling phenomena in semiconductors and development of quantum well structures
- 1988: John Bardeen, co-inventor of the transistor and contributor to the theory of superconductivity
- 1987: Herbert A. Simon, contributor to cross-disciplinary work between computer science, psychology, economics, and management, including the development of artificial intelligence and cognitive science
- 1986: Ronold W. P. King, leader in the development of electromagnetic antenna theory
- 1985: Amnon Yariv, innovator in quantum electronics and integrated optics
- 1984: Carver Mead and Lynn Conway, developers of CAD techniques for VLSI technology and authors of first VLSI textbook
- 1983: John Backus, developer of speed-coding and FORTRAN
- 1982: Maurice V. Wilkes, developer of world's second large-scale general-purpose electronic digital computer and author of first digital computer programmers textbook
- 1981: Richard W. Hamming, father of algebraic coding theory
- 1980: Robert N. Noyce, developer of the integrated circuit
- 1979: Edwin H. Land, Inventor of instant photography
- 1978: Claude E. Shannon, creator of quantitative Information theory
- 1977: Jan A. Rajchman, electronic and computer research
- 1976: Hyman G. Rickover, USN, father of the nuclear navy
- 1975: Chauncey Starr, founder of the Electric Power Research Institute (EPRI)
- 1974: Peter C. Goldmark, inventor of the 33-1/3 rpm long-playing record (among other things)
- 1973: John Mauchly and J. Presper Eckert, inventors of ENIAC
- 1972: Edward E. David Jr., science advisor to the President of the United States

== See also ==
- List of engineering awards
