= Herman Lukoff =

American computer pioneer

- Born: May 2, 1923; Philadelphia, PA
- Died: September 24, 1979 (aged 56); Bryn Mawr, PA
- Occupation: Computer scientist

Herman Lukoff (May 2, 1923 – September 24, 1979) was a computer pioneer and fellow of the IEEE.

== Formative years ==
Lukoff was born in Philadelphia, Pennsylvania to Aaron and Anna (Slemovitz) Lukoff. He graduated from the Moore School of Electrical Engineering at the University of Pennsylvania in 1943. While at the Moore School, he helped to develop the ENIAC and EDVAC computers.

Lukoff subsequently followed ENIAC co-inventors J. Presper Eckert and John W. Mauchly to their newly formed Electronic Control Company, which became Eckert-Mauchly Computer Corporation, and then became part of Remington Rand in 1950 and Sperry Corporation in 1955. He also assisted Eckert and Mauchly with the development of the UNIVAC computer and was chief engineer of the UNIVAC LARC from 1955 to 1961. He stayed with the company until his death.

== Death and interment ==
Lukoff died of leukemia on September 24, 1979, at Bryn Mawr Hospital in Bryn Mawr, Pennsylvania. At the time of his death, he lived in Fort Washington. Interred at Shalom Memorial Park in Huntingdon Valley, Pennsylvania, he was survived by his wife, Shirley Rosner Lukoff; his three sons, Arthur, Barry, and Andrew; and his daughter, Carol.

== Publications ==
Lukoff's memoir, From Dits to Bits, details his experiences as a first-hand observer of the birth of the computer industry.
