= CALDIC =

1950s electronic digital computer

CALDIC (the California Digital Computer) is an electronic digital computer that was built at the University of California, Berkeley, with the assistance of the Office of Naval Research, between 1951 and 1955. It was to assist and enhance research being conducted at the university with a platform for high-speed computing.

CALDIC was designed to be constructed at a low cost and simple to operate, by standards of the time. Input and output was via paper tape, which could be created or displayed using a teletype. It was a serial decimal machine with an 8-inch-diameter (200 mm), 10,000-word magnetic drum memory. (As CALDIC's decimal words were 10 digits each, the magnetic memory could store about 400,000 bits.) It contained 1,300 vacuum tubes, 1,000 crystal diodes, 100 magnetic elements (for the recording heads), and 12 relays (in the power supply). It weighed about 1,500 pounds (680 kg). It was capable of speeds of 50 iterations per second. CALDIC was a stored program computer with a six-digit instruction format (two digits for the opcode and four digits for the memory address).

The computer was initially planned by Paul Morton, Leland Cunningham, and Dick Lehmer; the latter two had been involved with the ENIAC at the University of Pennsylvania, and Lehmer had given one of the Moore School Lectures. Morton oversaw the design and construction with a team comprising electrical engineering graduate and undergraduate students at the university, more than 35 in total, including Doug Engelbart (who later invented the computer mouse) and Al Hoagland (a pioneer of the computer disk industry).

The machine was first ready for use in the summer of 1953 and mostly operational in 1954. Development cost through July 1955 was approximately $150,000.

== See also ==
- List of vacuum-tube computers
