= Albert Eugene Smith =

Albert Eugene Smith (1907–1973) was a computing pioneer who worked for the U.S. Navy following World War II. He founded the Digital Computer Newsletter published by the Navy from 1949 through 1968. Smith also participated in the development of the COBOL programming language.

Smith was born June 26, 1907, in Marshall, Illinois. He graduated from Indiana Central College (now University of Indianapolis), and completed an M.A. in physics at the University of Illinois. He taught high school and junior college until the outbreak of World War II. Smith was on active duty in the U.S. Navy from 1942 to 1946, completing his tour as a lieutenant commander. In June, 1946, he joined the computer section of the Mathematics Branch of the Office of Naval Research (ONR).

== Postwar computing ==
While at ONR and later at the U.S. Navy's Bureau of Ships, Smith oversaw research contracts including Whirlwind and the Harvard calculators. Starting in 1951, Smith collaborated with Mina Rees and Grace Murray Hopper to organize a series of seminars on computing development.

In 1946, Smith represented the ONR at the Moore School Lectures organized by the ENIAC team. The following year, Smith compiled summaries of active computer projects and published a survey of their activities. This led to the Navy's Digital Computer Newsletter.

== COBOL ==
In April, 1959, a group of computer manufacturers and users met at the University of Pennsylvania to plan the development of a computer language for business applications. At the time, business-oriented languages were built to work with specific computer systems. This new effort would seek to build a language whose programs could be easily adapted to run on other computers. Gene Smith represented the Navy's Bureau of Ships at that meeting. The development was divided among three task forces:

- Short Range – chaired by Grace Hopper
- Intermediate Range – chaired by Gene Smith
- Long Range – chaired by Saul Gorn

The COBOL language evolved from proposals developed by the Short Range Task Force. Smith remained active in the COBOL community through the Conference on Data System Languages (CODASYL) until his retirement.
