= Harold Pender =

American academic (1879–1959)

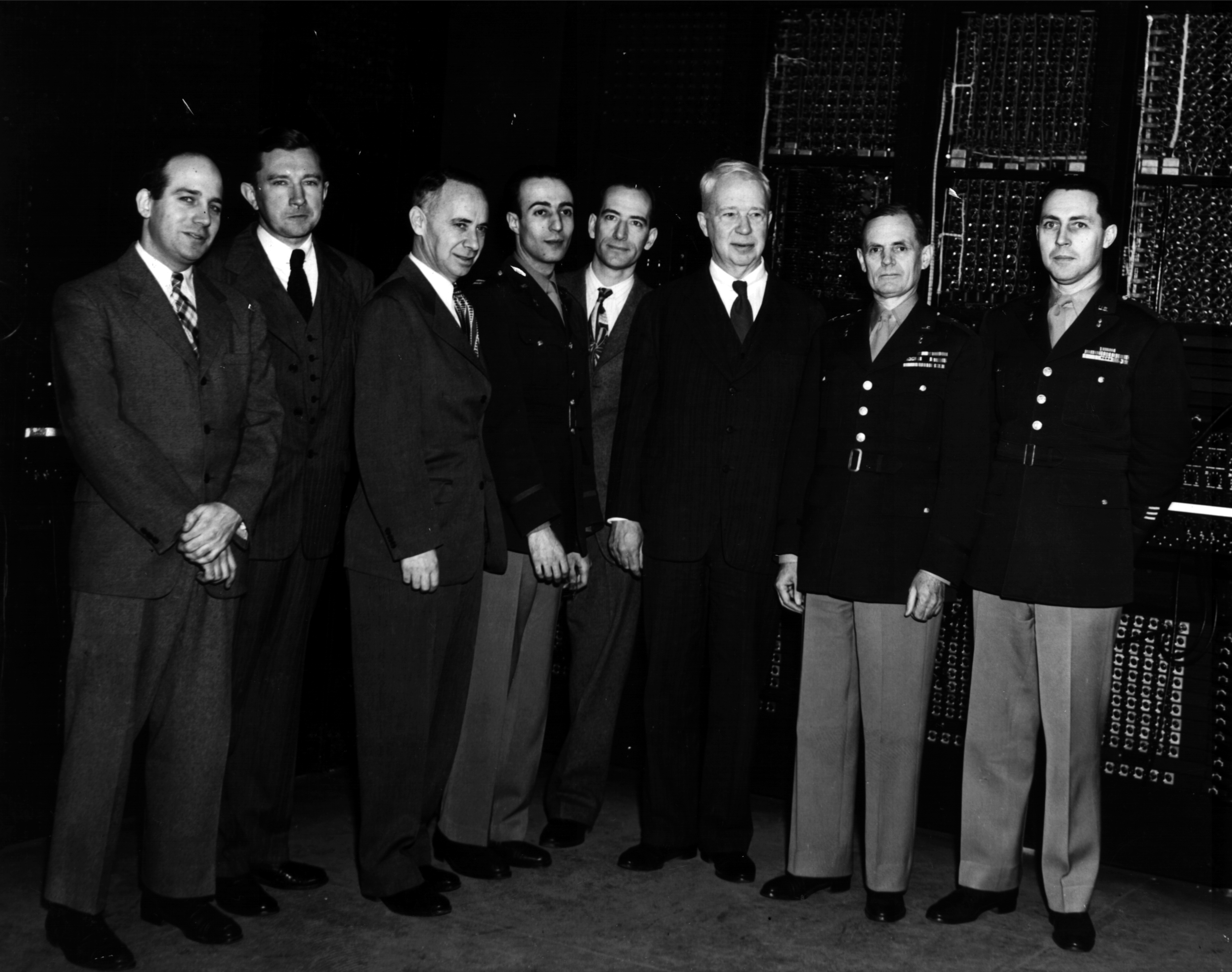
ENIAC officials - Pender is third from right

Harold Pender (13 January 1879, Tarboro, North Carolina – 6 Kennebunkport, Maine1959) was an American academic, author, and inventor. He was the first Dean of the University of Pennsylvania's Moore School of Electrical Engineering, a position he held from the founding of the School in 1923 until his retirement in 1949. During his tenure, the Moore School built the ENIAC, the first general-purpose electronic digital computer, and began construction of its successor machine, the EDVAC. Pender also proposed the Moore School Lectures, the first course in computers, which the Moore School offered by invitation in the summer of 1946.

Pender was elected to the American Academy of Arts and Sciences in 1913 and the American Philosophical Society in 1917.

The Harold Pender Award is named after him.

He and his wife Ailsa had one son, bridge player and figure skater Peter Pender.
