= Charles Bradford Sheppard =

C. Bradford Sheppard was an American working as a radio engineer for Hazeltine Electronics during World War II. Sheppard, who worked on radar in the design office, wished to fight Nazi Germany in the armed forces but was turned down by the US Army due to blindness in one eye. He then asked Soviet intelligence to arrange Soviet citizenship for himself and his family so that he could join the Soviet army. When the Soviets made clear he would not be allowed to fight he broke off all contact. Soviet intelligence assigned Sheppard the cover name MASTER or MASTER CRAFTSMAN.

After World War II, C. Bradford Sheppard was part of the original Eckert & Mauchly team of electrical engineers who designed and built the first digital computers, notably the ENIAC, EDVAC, and UNIVAC machines. In particular, he invented some of the first digital delay systems, also known as digital memory, which was based on sending sound waves down a mercury-filled cylinder.

C. Bradford Sheppard was one of the teachers in the original Moore School Lectures, given during the summer of 1946.

It is trivial to demonstrate that C. Bradford Sheppard was not a Soviet spy, as the Soviets never held information on the digital computers he helped develop as part of the Eckert-Mauchly Computer Corporation. These allegations were part of the infamous McCarthy campaign and were rebutted by Mauchly himself when a hearing was eventually afforded him.

== Venona ==
The following messages decrypted by the Venona project reference Sheppard:

- 1589, 1590 KGB New York to Moscow, 30 September 1943
- 886 KGB New York to Moscow, 22 June 1944
- 943 KGB New York to Moscow, 4 July 1944
