= Herman Goldstine =

American mathematician (1913–2004)

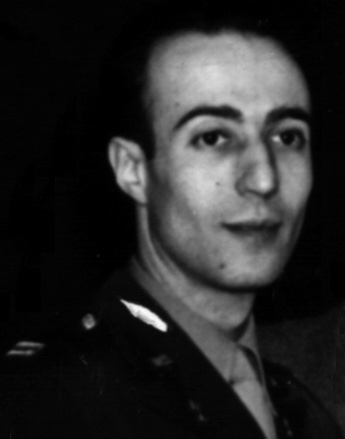
- Goldstine as a captain in the U.S. Army
- Born: Herman Heine Goldstine; September 13, 1913; Chicago, Illinois, U.S.
- Died: June 16, 2004 (aged 90); Bryn Mawr, Pennsylvania, U.S.
- Education: University of Chicago (PhD)
- Known for: Work on the ENIAC
- Spouses: Adele Katz (m. 1941; died 1964) Ellen Watson (m. 1966)
- Children: 2
- Scientific career
- Fields: Mathematics
- Workplaces: University of Michigan; Ballistic Research Laboratory; Institute for Advanced Study; IBM; American Philosophical Society
- Military career
- Allegiance: United States
- Branch: United States Army
- Rank: Captain
- Conflicts: World War II

Herman Heine Goldstine (September 13, 1913 – June 16, 2004) was a mathematician and computer scientist, who worked as the director of the IAS machine at the Institute for Advanced Study and helped to develop ENIAC, the first of the modern electronic digital computers. He subsequently worked for many years at IBM as an IBM Fellow, the company's most prestigious technical position.

== Early life ==
Goldstine was born in Chicago in 1913 to Jewish parents. He attended the University of Chicago, where he joined the Phi Beta Kappa fraternity, and graduated with a degree in mathematics in 1933, a master's degree in 1934, and a PhD in 1936. For three years he was a research assistant under Gilbert Ames Bliss, an authority on the mathematical theory of external ballistics.

== Career ==
=== Early career ===
In 1939 Goldstine began a teaching career at the University of Michigan, until the United States' entry into World War II; in July 1942, he left his position to enlist in the U.S. Army.

=== BRL and the Moore School ===
Goldstine was commissioned a lieutenant and worked as an ordnance mathematician calculating firing tables at the Ballistic Research Laboratory (BRL) at Aberdeen Proving Ground in Maryland. The firing tables were used in battle to find the appropriate elevation and azimuth for aiming artillery, which had a range of several miles.

The firing table calculations were accomplished by about one hundred women operating mechanical calculators. Each combination of gun, round, and geographical region required a unique set of firing tables. It took about 750 calculations to compute a single trajectory and each table had about 3,000 trajectories. It took a human computer at least 7 hours to calculate one trajectory. To increase production, BRL enlisted the computing facilities of the Moore School of Electrical Engineering at the University of Pennsylvania, with Goldstine as the liaison between BRL and the university.

==== ENIAC ====
While making some adjustments to the Moore School's mechanical differential analyzer, engineer Joseph Chapline suggested Goldstine visit John Mauchly, a physics instructor at the Moore School, who had distributed a memorandum proposing that the calculations could be done thousands of times faster with an electronic computer using vacuum tubes. Mauchly wrote a proposal and in June 1943 he and Goldstine secured funding from the Army for the project. ENIAC was built in 30 months with 200,000 man hours; it was completed in late 1945 as World War II was coming to an end.. It was huge, occupying a 30- by 60-foot room and weighing 30 tons with 18,000 vacuum tubes. The device could only store 20 numbers and took days to program.

==== EDVAC ====
In spite of disappointment that ENIAC had not contributed to the war effort, the Army was still interested in developing an electronic computer. Even before ENIAC's completion, the Army procured a second contract from the Moore School to build a successor machine known as EDVAC. Goldstine, Mauchly, J. Presper Eckert, and Arthur Burks began to study the development of the new machine in the hopes of correcting ENIAC's deficiencies.

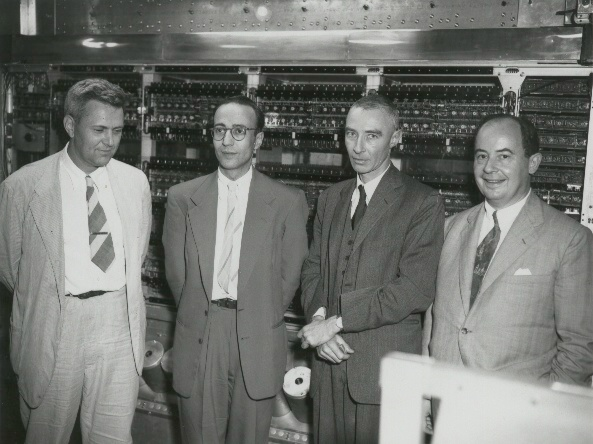
Herman Goldstine at The Princeton Institute for Advanced Study (left to right: Julian Bigelow, Herman Goldstine, J. Robert Oppenheimer, and John von Neumann)

==== Meeting John von Neumann ====
In the summer of 1944 Goldstine had a chance encounter with the prominent mathematician John von Neumann on a railway platform in Aberdeen, Maryland, and Goldstine described his project at the University of Pennsylvania. Unbeknownst to Goldstine, von Neumann was then working on the Manhattan Project, which was aiming to build the first atomic bomb. The calculations needed for this project were also daunting.

==== The First Draft ====
As a result of his conversations with Goldstine, von Neumann joined the study group and wrote a memo called First Draft of a Report on the EDVAC. Von Neumann intended this to be a memo to the study group, but Goldstine typed it up into a 101-page document that named von Neumann as the sole author. On June 25, 1946, Goldstine forwarded 24 copies of the document to those intimately involved in the EDVAC project; dozens or perhaps hundreds of mimeographs of the report were forwarded to von Neumann's colleagues at universities in the United States and in Great Britain in the weeks that followed. While incomplete, the paper was very well received and became a blueprint for building electronic digital computers. Due to von Neumann's prominence as a major American mathematician, the EDVAC architecture became known as the von Neumann architecture.

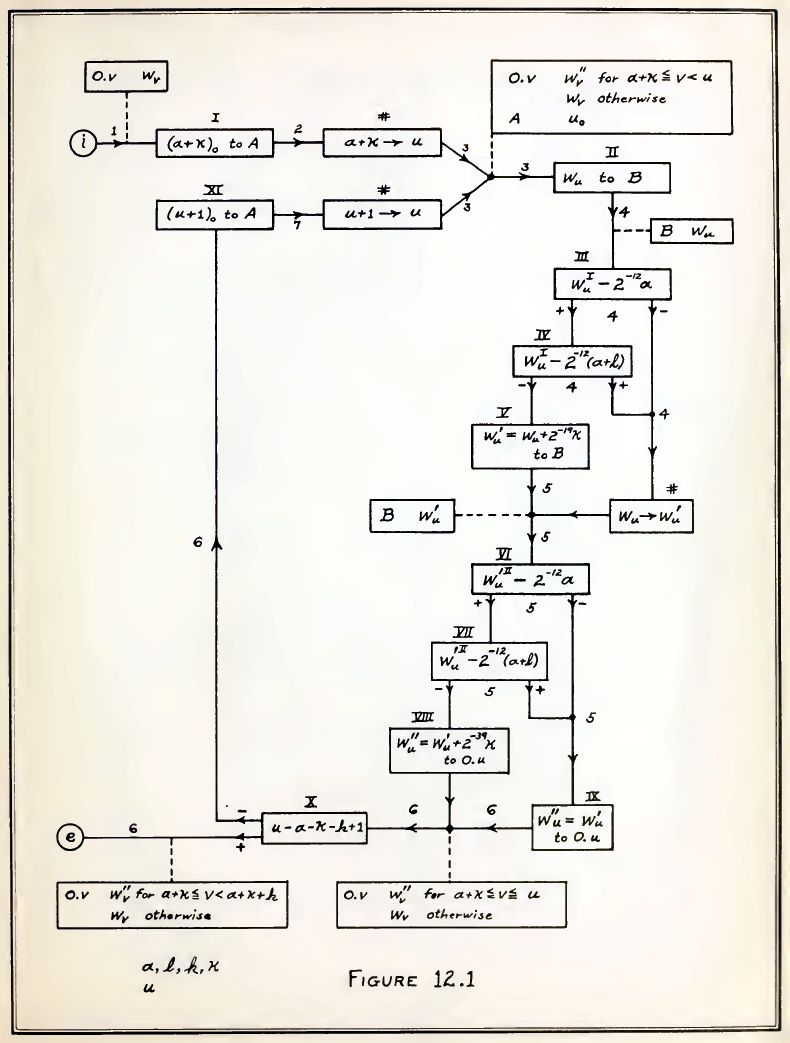
Flow chart from "Planning and coding of problems for an electronic computing instrument", 1947

One of the key ideas in the "first draft" was that the programmer could store a program in the computer's electronic memory, rather than program the computer using mechanical switches and patch cables. This and other ideas in the paper had been discussed in the EDVAC study group before von Neumann joined the group. The fact that Eckert and Mauchly, the actual inventors and designers of ENIAC, were not named as co-authors created resentment that led to the group's dissolution at the end of the war.

Eckert and Mauchly went on to form the Eckert-Mauchly Computer Corporation, a company that in part survives today as the Unisys Corporation, while von Neumann, Goldstine, and Burks moved on into academic life at the Institute for Advanced Study in Princeton, New Jersey. In summer 1946, all of them were reunited to give presentations at the first computer course, which has come to be known as the Moore School Lectures; Goldstine's presentations, given without notes, covered deeply and rigorously numerical mathematical methods useful in programs for digital computers.

=== Institute for Advanced Study ===
Atg the Institute for Advanced Study, Goldstine, von Neumann, and Burks built a computer referred to as the IAS machine. Goldstine was appointed assistant director of the project and after 1954 was its director.

The IAS machine influenced the design of IBM's early computers through von Neumann, who was a consultant to IBM. When von Neumann died in 1957, the IAS computer project was terminated. Goldstine went on to become the founding director of the Mathematical Sciences Department at IBM's Watson Research Center in Yorktown Heights, New York.

=== IBM ===
At IBM one of Goldstine's most significant roles was in fostering relations between IBM researchers and the academic community. In 1969 he was appointed an IBM Fellow, the company's most prestigious technical honor, and a consultant to the director of research. As a fellow, Goldstine developed an interest in the history of computing and mathematical sciences. He wrote three books on the topic: The Computer from Pascal to von Neumann, History of Numerical Analysis from the 16th Through the 19th Century, and History of the Calculus of Variations from the Seventeenth Through the Nineteenth Century. As the title implies, in The Computer from Pascal to von Neumann Goldstine leaves little doubt that in his opinion von Neumann played a critical role in developing modern theories of computing.

=== Later career ===
In retirement Goldstine was executive director of the American Philosophical Society in Philadelphia from 1985 to 1997, in which capacity he was able to attract many prestigious visitors and speakers.

== Personal life ==
In 1941 he married Adele Katz, who was an ENIAC programmer and who wrote the technical description for ENIAC. He had a daughter and a son with Adele, who died in 1964. Two years later, he married his second wife, Ellen Watson.

== Death ==
Goldstine died of Parkinson's disease on June 16, 2004, at his home in Bryn Mawr, Pennsylvania. The Thomas J. Watson Research Center renamed a post-doctoral fellowship in his honor.

== Awards and honoraria ==
- Harry H. Goode Memorial Award in 1979
- National Medal of Science (1985)
- Hall of Fame of the United States Army Ordnance Department (1997)
- Benjamin Franklin Medal for Distinguished Achievement in the Sciences of the American Philosophical Society (1997).
- IEEE Computer Society Pioneer Award (charter recipient)
- member of the National Academy of Sciences
- member of the American Academy of Arts and Sciences
- member of the American Philosophical Society

== Publications ==
- Arthur W. (Arthur Walter) Burks, Herman Heine Goldstine, John Von Neumann; Preliminary Discussion of the Logical Design of an Electronic Computer Instrument; (Institute for Advanced Study, January 1, 1946) ASIN B0007HW8WE
- Goldstine, Herman H.; Goldstine, A. (1982) [1946]. "The Electronic Numerical Integrator and Computer (ENIAC)". The Origins of Digital Computers: Selected Papers. New York: Springer-Verlag. pp. 359–373. ISBN 978-3-540-11319-5.
- Goldstine, Herman H. (1980-10-01). The Computer from Pascal to von Neumann. Princeton, NJ: Princeton University Press. ISBN 978-0-691-02367-0. Archived from the original on 2004-08-13.
- Goldstine, Herman H. (1973). New and Full Moons: 1001 B.C. to A.D. 1651. Philadelphia: American Philosophical Society. ISBN 978-0-87169-094-4.
- Goldstine, Herman H. (1977). History of Numerical Analysis from the 16th Through the 19th Century (Studies in the History of Mathematics and Physical Sciences, 2). New York: Springer-Verlag. ISBN 978-0-387-90277-7.
- Goldstine, Herman H. (October 1980). History of the Calculus of Variations from the Seventeenth Through the Nineteenth Century (Studies in the History of Mathematics and the Physical Sciences). New York: Springer-Verlag. ISBN 978-0-387-90521-1.
- Bernoulli, Jakob; Bernoulli, Jean; Goldstine, Herman H.; Radelet-de Grave, P. (September 1991). Die Streitschriften Von Jacob Und Johann Bernoulli: Variationsrechnung. Basel; Boston: Birkhäuser. ISBN 978-3-7643-2348-6.
