= Jeffrey Chuan Chu =

Computer scientist (1919–2011)

- Born: July 14, 1919; Tianjin, Republic of China
- Died: June 6, 2011 (aged 91)
- Citizenship: China
- Education: University of Minnesota(BSc), Moore School at the University of Pennsylvania(MSc)
- Alma mater: University of Pennsylvania
- Occupations: computer engineer, researcher
- Spouse: Else Harlan(1942) Loretta Yung Chu(1976)
- Awards: Computer Pioneer Award

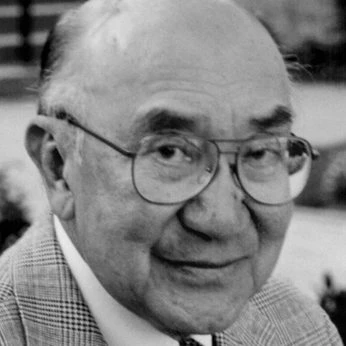
Jeffrey Chuan Chu (1919 – 2011)

Jeffrey Chuan Chu (朱傳榘) (July 14, 1919 – June 6, 2011), was a pioneer computer engineer. His work was critical in the development of the computing industries in both the United States and China.

Chu was born in Tianjin, Republic of China. He received his Bachelor of Science (BS) degree from the University of Minnesota and his Master of Science (MS) degree from the Moore School at the University of Pennsylvania.

Notably, Chu was a member of the engineering team that designed the first American electronic computer, the ENIAC.

Following his work on the ENIAC, Chu would go on to work as a scientist in a variety of laboratories where he helped develop iterations of early computers based on IAS architecture and vacuum-tube technology.

Starting in the 1980s, following a meeting with Chinese leader Deng Xiaoping, Chu became active in efforts to modernize China through forming international academic partnerships and facilitating the exchange of Western business practices to China. He served on various Chinese state boards and taught at multiple Chinese universities.

The first IEEE Computer Society Computer Pioneer Award was awarded to him in 1981.

== Early life and education ==
Jeffrey Chuan Chu was born to a family of scholars in Tianjin, Republic of China, a city located near the capital of Beijing on July 14, 1919. As Chu was the eldest son, he received private tutoring at his family's home from the age of five until the age of twelve. He was schooled in Chinese classics, English, mathematics, and martial arts.

After transitioning to public school and graduating from secondary school, Chu attended Fudan University, formerly known as the University of Shanghai. However, when the Second Sino-Japanese War reached Shanghai in 1940, his family sent him to the United States to complete his studies. He first attended the University of Minnesota where he earned a Bachelor of Science degree and later the Moore School at the University of Pennsylvania where he was awarded a Master of Science degree in Electrical Engineering. Chu also earned a D.Sc from Fournier Institute of Technology.

Notably, while still a graduate student at the University of Pennsylvania, Chu was initiated into the Phi Lambda Fraternity in 1944. He was 25 years old.

== Career and contributions ==
=== Contributions to the ENIAC ===
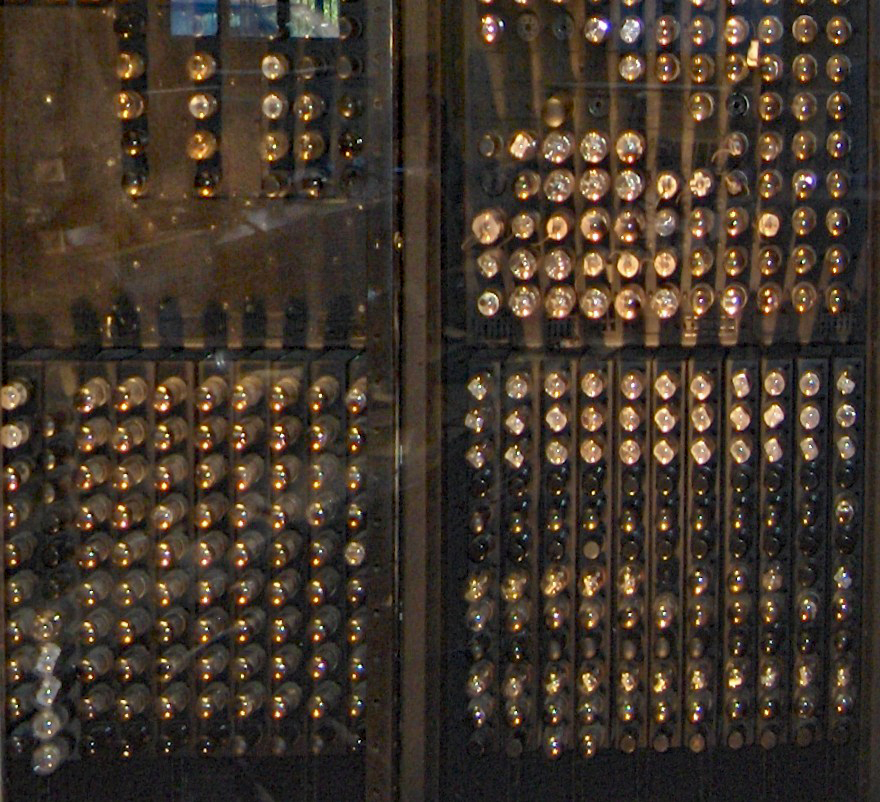
Piece of ENIAC at the Moore School of Engineering and Applied Science

Jeffrey Chuan Chu played an important role in the development of the Electronic Numerical Integrator and Computer (ENIAC), the first general-purpose electronic digital computer. The ENIAC was developed during World War II to assist the United States Army in calculating artillery firing tables.

As a core member of the engineering team at the University of Pennsylvania's Moore School of Electrical Engineering, Chu was responsible for designing the divider and square-rooter units of the ENIAC. These components were essential for performing complex arithmetic operations, enabling the ENIAC to execute division and square root calculations efficiently.

Completed in 1945 and publicly unveiled in 1946, the ENIAC marked a significant milestone in the history of computing. Chu's work laid the foundation for future developments in electronic computing, accelerating the evolution of computing technology. His contributions exemplify the collaborative efforts that were crucial in bringing ENIAC to fruition, ultimately revolutionizing the way computations were performed and influencing the design of subsequent computers.

=== Career history ===
After his time on the ENIAC team, Chu transitioned into work at facilities like the Argonne National Laboratory where he worked on the Argonne Version of the Institute's Digital Automatic Computer (AVIDAC) and later the Oak Ridge National Laboratory on the Oak Ridge Automatic Computer and Logical Engine (ORACLE). He later took on the position of a research engineer at the Reeves Instrument Company.

In 1955, he became the Chief Engineer for the LARC (Livermore Automatic Research Computer) project at Remington Rand's Univac division. Years later in 1962, Chu an would join Honeywell Information Systems, first as their Director of Engineering and later in 1965 as Vice President. He cultivated important early partnerships between Honeywell and Japanese technology firms Nippon Electric Company (NEC) and Toshiba.

Following his work with Honeywell, he was named as the Senior Vice President for North American Operations at Wang Laboratories. Five years later Chu became chairman and CEO of Sanders Technology (Santec). Throughout the 1980s, he worked as a Senior Advisor at the Stanford Research Institute (SRI) and Data Resources Inc. (DRI), also serving on the Board of Directors of Columbia International and BTU International during this time.

=== Contributions to East Asia ===
In 1974, the Taiwanese government invited Chu to contribute to the planning of Hsinchu Science Park, a project that laid the foundation for Taiwan’s sizeable semiconductor industry. Today, the park is home to around 500 tech companies and is considered a hub for global semiconductor manufacturing.

In October 1978, at a time of improving U.S.-China relations and the beginning of China’s Open Door Policy, Chu and his wife, Loretta, returned to China for the first time in nearly forty years. He was 59 years old. In 1980, after meeting with Chinese leader Deng Xiaoping, Chu committed to the mission of modernizing China’s economy and technology sector.

==== Modernizing China’s economy and technology sector ====
Chu served on various state boards, including as an advisor to the Chairman of the Science & Technology Commission. He facilitated the exchange of technical expertise and introduced knowledge of Western business practices to China. His advisory role extended to American companies, including Sanders Technology (Santec), helping them navigate business engagements with China. In 1983, while serving as chairman and CEO of Santec, he oversaw a major deal in which the Chinese government invested over $4 million in cash and equipment for equity in the company.

==== Promoting education ====
Starting in the 1980s, apart from focusing on accomplishing his Chinese state-centered goals, Chu also found time to be an academic. He served as an adjunct professor at multiple Chinese universities, including Jiao Tong University and Shandong University. He fostered international academic partnerships, establishing a scholarship for Chinese students to study English at Jiao Tong University, and facilitating collaboration between Jiao Tong University and the Wharton School of the University of Pennsylvania. Additionally, he founded the Campus Civility Award at Jiao Tong University to recognize students for public service.

== Awards ==
In 1981, Jeffrey Chuan Chu was the first person ever selected by the IEEE for the Computer Pioneer Award. Additionally, he was awarded the title of official IEEE Fellow for his contributions in the computing field, particularly his work in the logic design of electronic computers.

== Personal life ==
Jeffrey Chuan Chu met his first wife, Else Harlan, at the University of Minnesota. Both were pursuing undergraduate degrees. They married in 1942, and had three daughters: Lynnet, Bambi, and Deirdre (Dashi).

Following his divorce in 1976, he married Loretta Yung Chu. During their nearly 40 years of marriage, he and his wife explored the globe, visiting every continent besides Antarctica.

He maintained connections with his large family, in the U.S. and internationally, and was known to hold family reunions every five years on his birthday. The last of these reunions took place in Concord, Massachusetts, celebrating his 90th birthday.

Chu died in 2011, at the age of 91. He has 8 grandchildren and 7 great-grandchildren.
