= Al Hoagland =

American computer engineer (1926–2022)

Albert S. Hoagland
- Born: September 13, 1926; Berkeley, California
- Died: October 1, 2022 (aged 96); Portland, Oregon
- Education: University of California, Berkeley
- Occupations: engineer, educator
- Employer(s): IBM, Santa Clara University
- Spouse: Jeannine Maryse Claude Simart (m. 1950-2010)
- Awards: IEEE Fellow, 1966; President, IEEE Computer Society, 1972-73; President AFIPS, 1974-80; IEEE Computer Society Meritorious Service Certificate, 1990

Albert Smiley Hoagland ('Al Hoagland') (September 13, 1926 – October 1, 2022) had a long career on the development of hard disk drives (HDD) starting with the IBM RAMAC. From 1956 to 1984, he was with IBM in San Jose, California, and then, from 1984 to 2005, he was the director of the Institute for Information Storage Technology at Santa Clara University. He wrote the first book on Digital Magnetic Recording. Hoagland played a central role in the preservation and restoration of the IBM RAMAC now displayed at the Computer History Museum, Mountain View, California. He died in Portland, Oregon, on 1 October 2022.

== Background and education ==
Al Hoagland was born in Berkeley, California, on September 13, 1926. His parents were Dennis Robert Hoagland (1884–1949), and Jessie A. Smiley (1894–1933). He had two brothers, Robert Charles H. and Charles Rightmire H. His father was a Professor of Plant Nutrition at the University of California at Berkeley. His mother Jessie, died suddenly of pneumonia when Al Hoagland was 7 years old.

Hoagland started his studies at the University of California, Berkeley in 1944. He completed his BS degree in Electrical Engineering in 1947, his MS in 1948, and his PhD in 1954 (Paul Morton, advisor). Hoagland became interested in the California Digital Computer (CALDIC) project being pursued at Berkeley and signed up with Paul L. Morton as research advisor and took on the responsibility for developing the system's magnetic drum memory. Hoagland received an M.Sc. in 1948 with a thesis entitled "Magnetic Storage Methods for Electronic Computation". He went on to obtain a Ph.D. in 1954 with the dissertation "Magnetic Recording of Binary Information", both under the supervision of Paul Morton. Hoagland was an assistant professor at Berkeley in 1954-55,

== Career ==
In 1953, while still at Berkeley, Hoagland received a visit from Lou Stevens who had recently graduated from the CALDIC project and joined IBM's newly established west coast lab in San Jose, California led by Rey Johnson. Stevens was leading the RAMAC Hard Disk Drive development and, because of the shared interest, Hoagand was invited to be a consultant on the project where he contributed to the magnetic component (heads and media) design and data-detection design.

In 1956, Hoagland left Berkeley and formally joined the IBM San Jose laboratory shortly before the announcement of the IBM RAMAC. Hoagland conducted some of the first studies on track-following servo for HDD and wrote an early patent. Hoagland also conducted some of the first experiments with perpendicular recording. In 1962, he took an assignment in Rotterdam to support Philips in converting the national banking systems to disk storage. He used the opportunity to write the book "Digital Magnetic Recording" published in 1963. Hoagland's tenure at IBM included serving as Director for Technical Planning for the IBM Research Division.

In 1982, IBM asked Hoagland to work together with Denis Mee and Mark Kryder to establish data storage centers to promote collaboration between industry and academia. The first two centers established were at the University of California at San Diego (UCSD) and at Carnegie Mellon University (CMU). Hoagland played a particular role with Jim Lemke in establishing the Center for Magnetic Recording Research (CMRR) at UCSD where he assumed a role as the first director on a temporary basis (1983–84) before John Mallinson (physicist) took up the role. Noting that there was no such “center” in the Santa Clara Valley where most of the disk drive technologists were located, Hoagland proposed starting such a center at Santa Clara University (SCU).

In 1984, Hoagland left IBM to join Santa Clara University as an adjunct professor and as the founding director of the new Institute for Institute for Information Storage Technology (IIST) at SCU. The Institute (IIST) was responsible for organising numerous short courses, symposia, and an annual workshop at Lake Arrowhead, California on the data storage industry and technology, including both optical recording and magnetic recording

In 2001, Hoagland established the Magnetic Disk Heritage Center (MDHC) with the mission “to preserve the story and historical legacy of magnetic disk storage at 99 Notre Dame, San Jose, California, where it all began.” Hoagland, as director of the center, secured commitments from San Jose city council to preserve this site where the RAMAC was designed and to get it designated as an IEEE Historical Milestone. In 2002, Hoagland acquired an original RAMAC from IBM. The restoration was started at IIST and subsequently completed at the Computer History Museum where the working RAMAC is now routinely demonstrated. An archive copy of the MDHC website is held at the Computer History Museum, Mountain View.

In 2005, Hoagland retired from his position at Santa Clara University and moved to Portland, Oregon.

He died in Portland on October 1, 2022, survived by his three children.

== Awards and recognition ==
Hoagland has received the following awards and recognition:

- In 1956, Hoagland received the AIEE Outstanding Paper Award for "Magnetic Data Recording Theory: Head Design".
- In 1966, He was elevated to IEEE Fellow for "Contributions to the Fields of Magnetic Recording and Computer Data Storage".
- From 1972 to 73, Hoagland was president of the IEEE Computer Society.
- From 1974 to 75, he was an IEEE Director (Board Member)
- From 1974 to 1980, he was President of the American Federation of Information Processing Societies (AFIPS)
- In 1984, he received the IEEE Centennial Medal
- In 1990, he receive the IEEE Computer Society Meritorious Service Certificate for “years of dedicated service to improving the society’s operations and support to volunteers”.
- In 1991, he received the IBM, RAMAC Pioneer Award
- In 1996, he was awarded the IEEE Computer Society Golden Core Award, 1996
- In 2000, he was one of the recipients of the IEEE Third Millennium Medal
- Hoagland was also a trustee of the Charles Babbage Foundation for the History of Computing

Hoagland has authored and coauthored numerous scientific publications generally around the topics of magnetic recording and hard disk drives. In 1963, Hoagland published the first book devoted to digital magnetic recording. It was reviewed by Marvin Camras. An updated second edition co-authored with Jim Monson was published in 1991
