= Dummy variable =

The term dummy variable can refer to either of the following:

- Bound variable, in mathematics and computer science, a placeholder variable
- Dummy variable (statistics), an indicator variable
