= David R. Brown (engineer) =

American computer scientist

David Randolph Brown (October 31, 1923 – April 16, 2016) was an American computer scientist. He was a member of the Massachusetts Institute of Technology leadership team that created Project Whirlwind, "one of the first large-scale, high-speed computers".

== Moore School Lectures ==
In 1946, David Brown was one of twenty-eight students chosen to attend the Moore School Lectures, a seminal lecture series in which the revolutionary potential of digital computers was presented by a consortium of pioneers "who almost constituted a Who’s Who of computing of the day." Brown represented the MIT Servomechanisms Laboratory, which became the early research and development center for Project Whirlwind, under the direction of Jay Forrester.

== Project Whirlwind ==
In 1947, Jay Forrester enlisted David R. Brown to work on Project Whirlwind. Brown was in charge of Whirlwind's Electrical Engineering Division. He became the group leader for Group 63—Magnetic Materials. Group 63 developed, built, and installed Project Whirlwind’s ferrite magnetic core memory, which had been conceived (and was later patented) by Forrester.

Brown subsequently worked on the SAGE computer defense system, Division 6 at MIT Lincoln Laboratory, where he became the first manager of the Advanced Development Group. He went on to work for the MITRE Corporation, "a non-profit organization to continue classified research and development projects that had transitioned to an operational stage and needed to be phased out of Lincoln Laboratory."

In 1963, he went to work for SRI International (then called Stanford Research Institute) in Menlo Park, California as manager of the Computer Techniques Laboratory and later as head of the Information Science Laboratory. He did early work on artificial intelligence and robotics. On Sept. 17, 2015, he was inducted into the SRI International Hall of Fame "for exceptional contributions to the enduring success of SRI International." The Hall of Fame award citation for David R. Brown states,

David had a hand in bringing to SRI a set of talented researchers such that by the start of 1969 a huge breakout of new identifiable efforts emerged. At that moment, the Engineering Sciences Division expanded from five labs to a dozen identifiable program areas under just two leaders, one of whom was David Brown. David’s group of six programs included the Artificial Intelligence Group, the Augmented Human Intellect Center, and the Computer Science Group, all of which evolved into independent labs with researchers who became world leaders in their field. As these labs matured, David continued as head of the Information Science Laboratory for another 8 years, and his tenure at SRI would eventually total 30 years.

He is a Life Fellow of the Institute of Electrical and Electronics Engineers. The IEEE Life Fellow is "a distinction reserved for select IEEE members whose extraordinary accomplishments in any of the IEEE fields of interest are deemed fitting of this prestigious grade elevation." Brown was nominated as an IEEE Life Fellow "For leadership in the development of digital-computer components and the design and operation of large-scale information processing systems."

== Publications ==
- Brown, David R. and Ernst Albers-Schoenberg."Ferrites Speed Digital Computers."
- Brown, David R. "Gate Circuits Report" (Project Whirlwind). Massachusetts Institute of Technology. Servomechanisms Laboratory, Project Whirlwind, 1946.
- Artificial Intelligence/Robotics Applications to Navy Aircraft Maintenance, Volumes 53-84 of CNLD CR. Authors: David R. Brown, Richard H. Monahan, William T. Park, SRI International, Menlo Park CA, David W. Taylor Naval Ship Research and Development Center. Publisher: SRI International, 1984.
- Brown, David R. and William T. Park. "Military Space Robotics." SRI International, Menlo Park, CA Geoscience and Engineering Center. Publisher: Defense Technical Information Center, 1987.
