= Serial decimal =

In computers, a serial decimal numeric representation is one in which ten bits are reserved for each digit, with a different bit turned on depending on which of the ten possible digits is intended. ENIAC and CALDIC used this representation.

== See also ==
- Bit-serial architecture
- Digit-serial architecture
- 1-of-10 code
- One-hot code
