= University of Pennsylvania School of Engineering and Applied Science =

Engineering school of the University of Pennsylvania in Philadelphia, Pennsylvania

Coordinates: 39.951775°N 75.190217°W

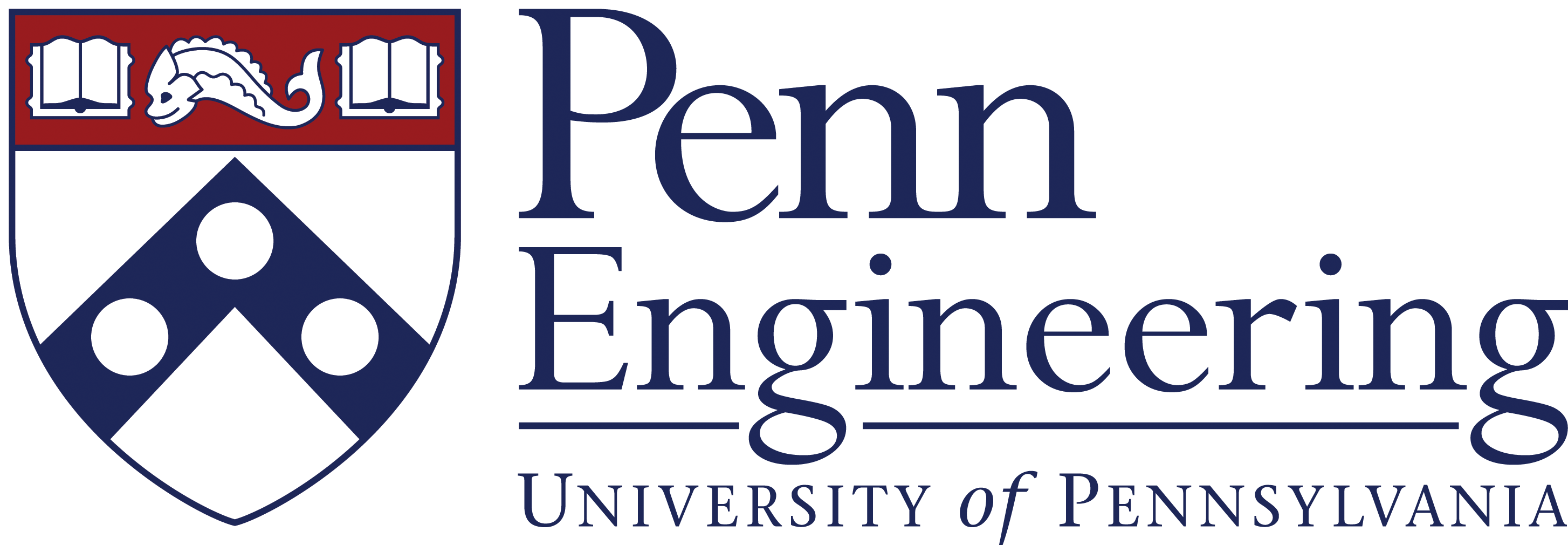
- Former name: Towne Scientific School
- Motto: Leges sine moribus vanae
- Motto in English: Laws without morals are in vain
- Type: Private engineering school
- Established: 1852; 174 years ago
- Parent institution: University of Pennsylvania
- President: J. Larry Jameson
- Dean: Vijay Kumar
- Academic staff: 113
- Undergraduates: 1688
- Location: Philadelphia, Pennsylvania, U.S.
- Campus: Urban
- Website: seas.upenn.edu

The University of Pennsylvania School of Engineering and Applied Science (Penn Engineering or SEAS) is the undergraduate and graduate engineering school of the University of Pennsylvania, a private Ivy League research university in Philadelphia. The school offers programs that emphasize hands-on study of engineering fundamentals (with an offering of approximately 300 courses) while encouraging students to leverage the educational offerings of the broader University. Engineering students can also take advantage of research opportunities through interactions with Penn’s School of Medicine, School of Arts and Sciences, and the Wharton School.

Penn Engineering offers bachelors, masters, and doctoral degree programs in contemporary fields of engineering study. The nationally ranked bioengineering department offers the school's most popular undergraduate degree program. The Jerome Fisher Program in Management and Technology, offered in partnership with the Wharton School, allows students to simultaneously earn a Bachelor of Science degree in Economics as well as a Bachelor of Science degree in Engineering. SEAS also offers several masters programs, which include: Executive Master’s in Technology Management, Master of Biotechnology, Master of Computer and Information Technology, Master of Computer and Information Science and a Master of Science in Engineering in Telecommunications and Networking.

== History ==
The study of engineering at the University of Pennsylvania can be traced back to 1850 when the University trustees adopted a resolution providing for a professorship of "Chemistry as Applied to the Arts". In 1852, the study of engineering was further formalized with the establishment of the School of Mines, Arts and Manufactures. The first Professor of Civil and Mining Engineering was appointed in 1852. The first graduate of the school received his Bachelor of Science degree in 1854. Since that time, the school has grown to six departments. In 1973, the school was renamed as the School of Engineering and Applied Science.

The early growth of the school benefited from the generosity of two Philadelphians: John Henry Towne and Alfred Fitler Moore. Towne, a mechanical engineer and railroad developer, bequeathed the school a gift of $500,000 upon his death in 1875. The main administration building for the school still bears his name. Moore was a successful entrepreneur who made his fortune manufacturing telegraph cable. A 1923 gift from Moore established the Moore School of Electrical Engineering, the birthplace of the first electronic general-purpose Turing-complete digital computer, ENIAC, in 1946.

During the latter half of the 20th century the school continued to break new ground. In 1958, Barbara G. Mandell became the first woman to enroll as an undergraduate in the School of Engineering. In 1965, the university acquired two sites that were formerly used as U.S. Army Nike Missile Base (PH 82L and PH 82R) and created the Valley Forge Research Center. In 1976, the Management and Technology Program was created. In 1990, a Bachelor of Applied Science in Biomedical Science and Bachelor of Applied Science in Environmental Science were first offered, followed by a master's degree in Biotechnology in 1997.

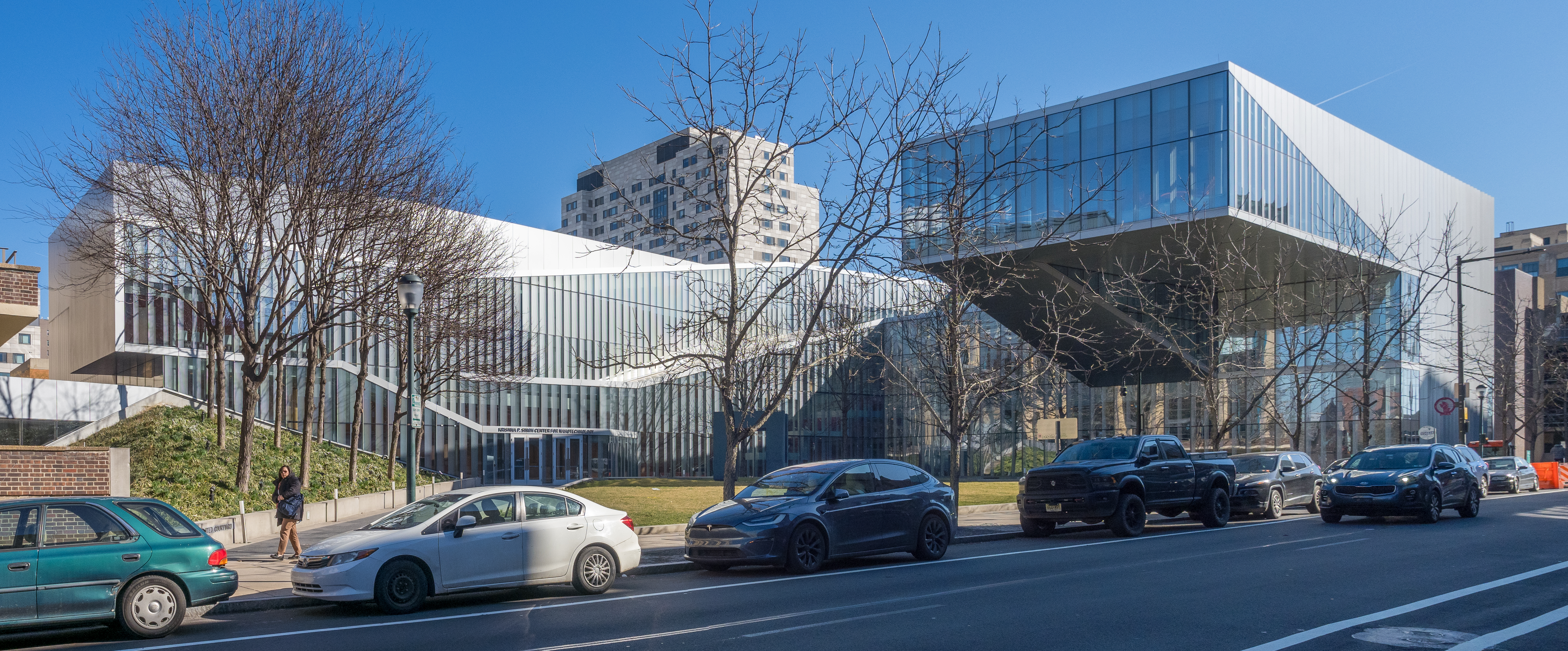
Singh Center for Nanotechnology (2024)

The school continues to expand with the addition of the Melvin and Claire Levine Hall for computer science in 2003, Skirkanich Hall for bioengineering in 2006, and the Krishna P. Singh Center for Nanotechnology in 2013.

== Academics ==
Penn’s School of Engineering and Applied Science is organized into six departments:

- Bioengineering
- Chemical and Biomolecular Engineering
- Computer and Information Science
- Electrical and Systems Engineering
- Materials Science and Engineering
- Mechanical Engineering and Applied Mechanics

The school’s Department of Bioengineering, originally named Biomedical Electronic Engineering, consistently garners a top-ten ranking at both the undergraduate and graduate level from U.S. News & World Report. The department also houses the George H. Stephenson Foundation Educational Laboratory & Bio-MakerSpace (aka Biomakerspace or BioMaker Space) for training undergraduate through PhD students. It is Philadelphia's and Penn's only Bio-MakerSpace and it is open to the Penn community, encouraging a free flow of ideas, creativity, and entrepreneurship between Bioengineering students and students throughout the university.

Founded in 1893, the Department of Chemical and Biomolecular Engineering is “America's oldest continuously operating degree-granting program in chemical engineering.”

The Department of Electrical and Systems Engineering is recognized for its research in electroscience, systems science and network systems and telecommunications.

Originally established in 1946 as the School of Metallurgical Engineering, the Materials Science and Engineering Department “includes cutting edge programs in nanoscience and nanotechnology, biomaterials, ceramics, polymers, and metals.”

The Department of Mechanical Engineering and Applied Mechanics draws its roots from the Department of Mechanical and Electrical Engineering, which was established in 1876.

Each department houses one or more degree programs. The Chemical and Biomolecular Engineering, Materials Science and Engineering, and Mechanical Engineering and Applied Mechanics departments each house a single degree program.

Bioengineering houses two programs (both a Bachelor of Science in Engineering degree as well as a Bachelor of Applied Science degree). Electrical and Systems Engineering offers four Bachelor of Science in Engineering programs: Electrical Engineering, Systems Engineering, Computer Engineering, and the Networked & Social Systems Engineering, the latter two of which are co-housed with Computer and Information Science (CIS). The CIS department, like Bioengineering, offers Computer and Information Science programs under both bachelor programs. CIS also houses Digital Media Design, a program jointly operated with PennDesign.

== Research ==
Penn's School of Engineering and Applied Science is a research institution. SEAS research strives to advance science and engineering and to achieve a positive impact on society. Faculty at Penn’s School of Engineering and Applied Science have created several centers for advanced study including.
