= Moore School of Electrical Engineering =

School at the University of Pennsylvania

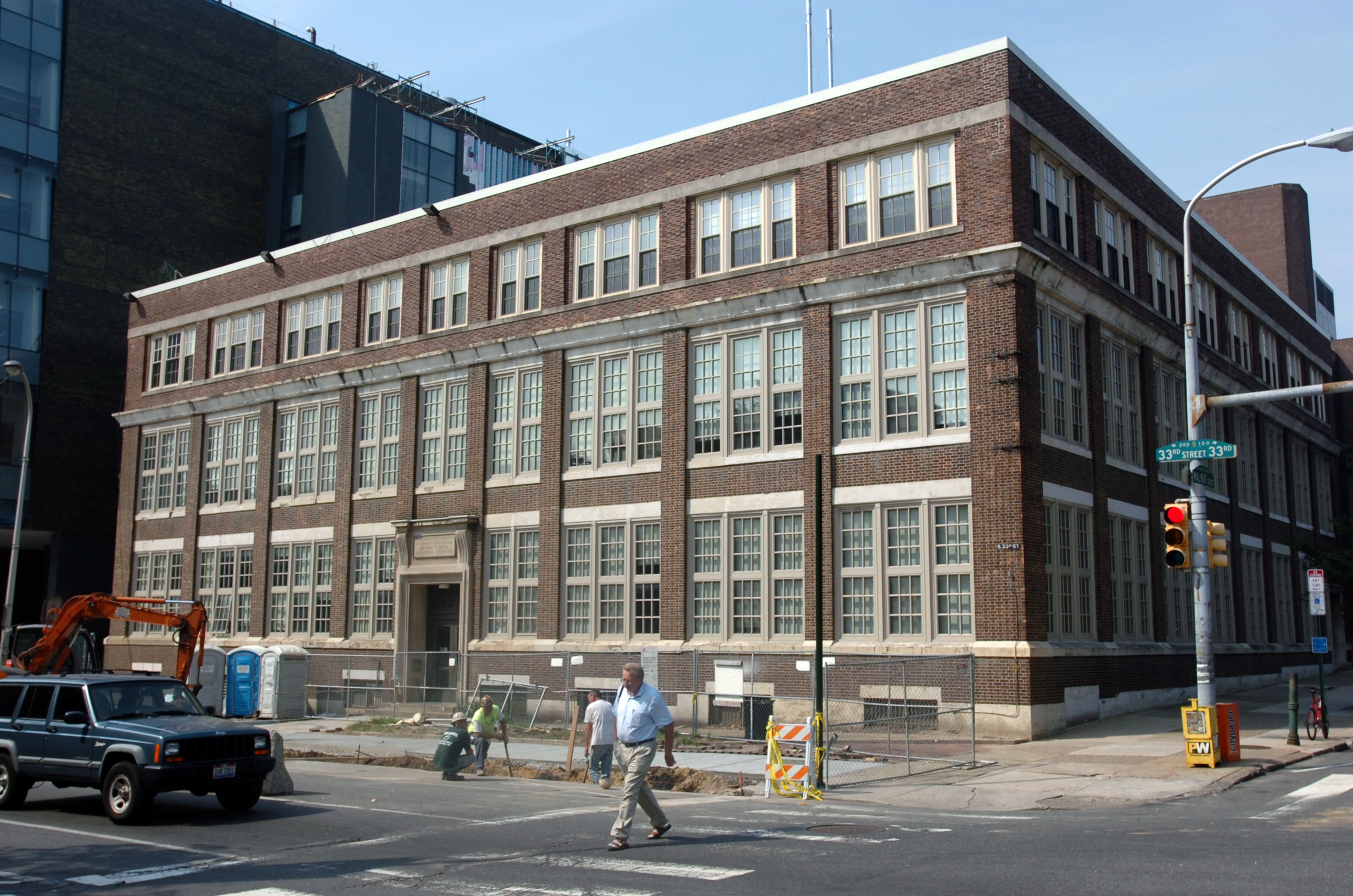
Moore School of Electrical Engineering

The Moore School of Electrical Engineering was a school at the University of Pennsylvania. The school was integrated into the University of Pennsylvania School of Engineering and Applied Science.

The Moore School came into existence as a result of an endowment from Alfred Fitler Moore on June 4, 1923. It was granted to Penn's School of Electrical Engineering, located in the Towne Building. The first dean of the Moore School was Harold Pender.

The Moore School is particularly famed as the birthplace of the computer industry:

- It was here that the first general-purpose Turing complete digital electronic computer, the ENIAC, was built between 1943 and 1946.
- Preliminary design work on the ENIAC's successor machine the EDVAC resulted in the stored program concept used in all computers today, the logical design having been promulgated in John von Neumann's First Draft of a Report on the EDVAC, a set of notes synthesized from meetings he attended at the Moore School.
- The first computer course was given at the Moore School in Summer 1946, leading to an explosion in computer development all over the world.
- Moore School faculty John Mauchly and J. Presper Eckert founded the first computer company, which produced the UNIVAC computer.

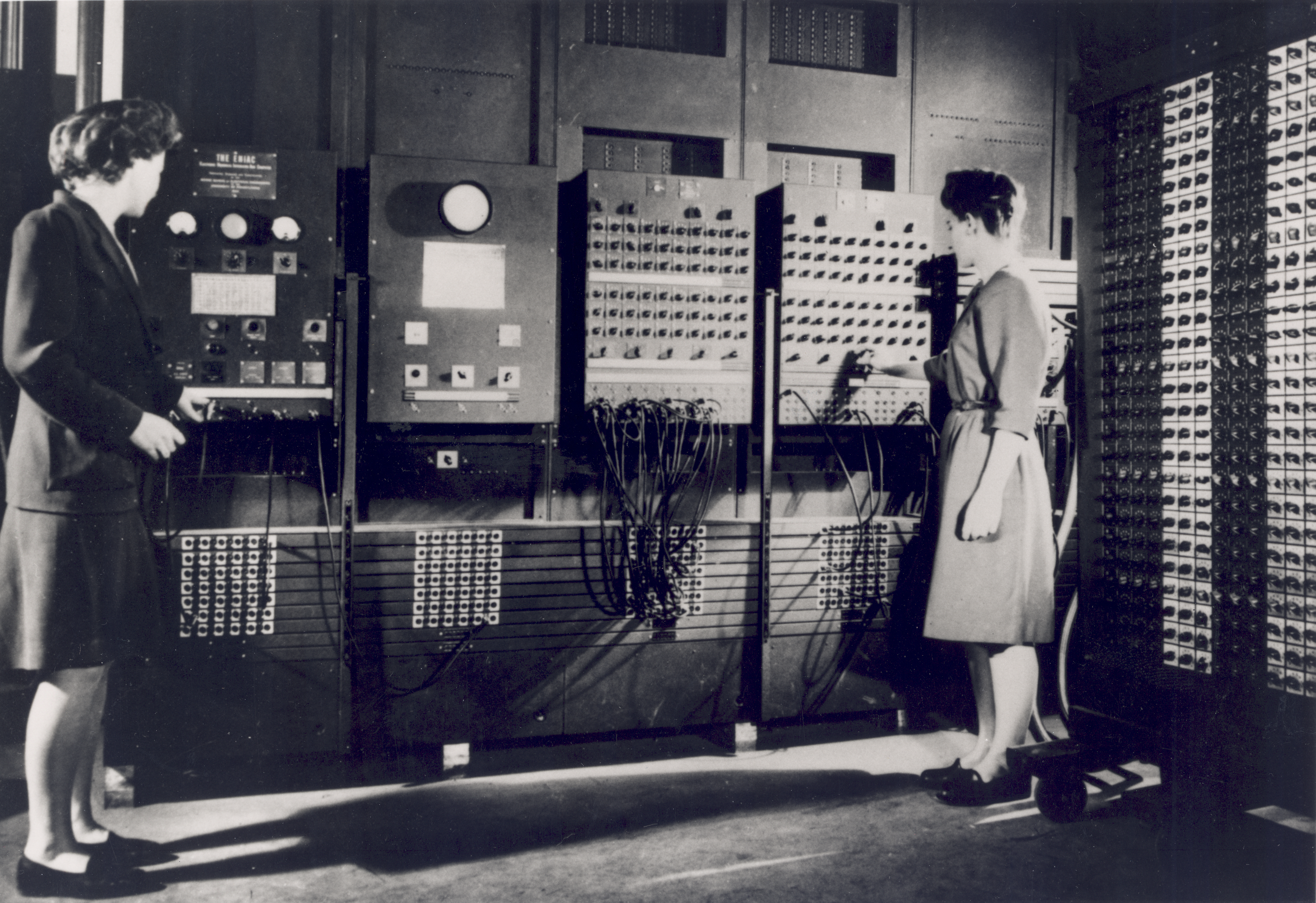
Programmers operate the ENIAC's main control panel at the Moore School of Electrical Engineering. "U.S. Army Photo" from the archives of the ARL Technical Library. Left: Betty Jean Jennings; right: Fran Bilas.

The Moore School has been integrated into Penn's School of Engineering and Applied Science. It no longer exists as a separate entity; however, the three-story structure itself still stands and is known on campus as the Moore School Building. Originally constructed in 1921 as a two-story building by Erskin & Morris, it was renovated in 1926 by Paul Philippe Cret and a third story was added in 1940 by Alfred Bendiner.
