= History of women in engineering =

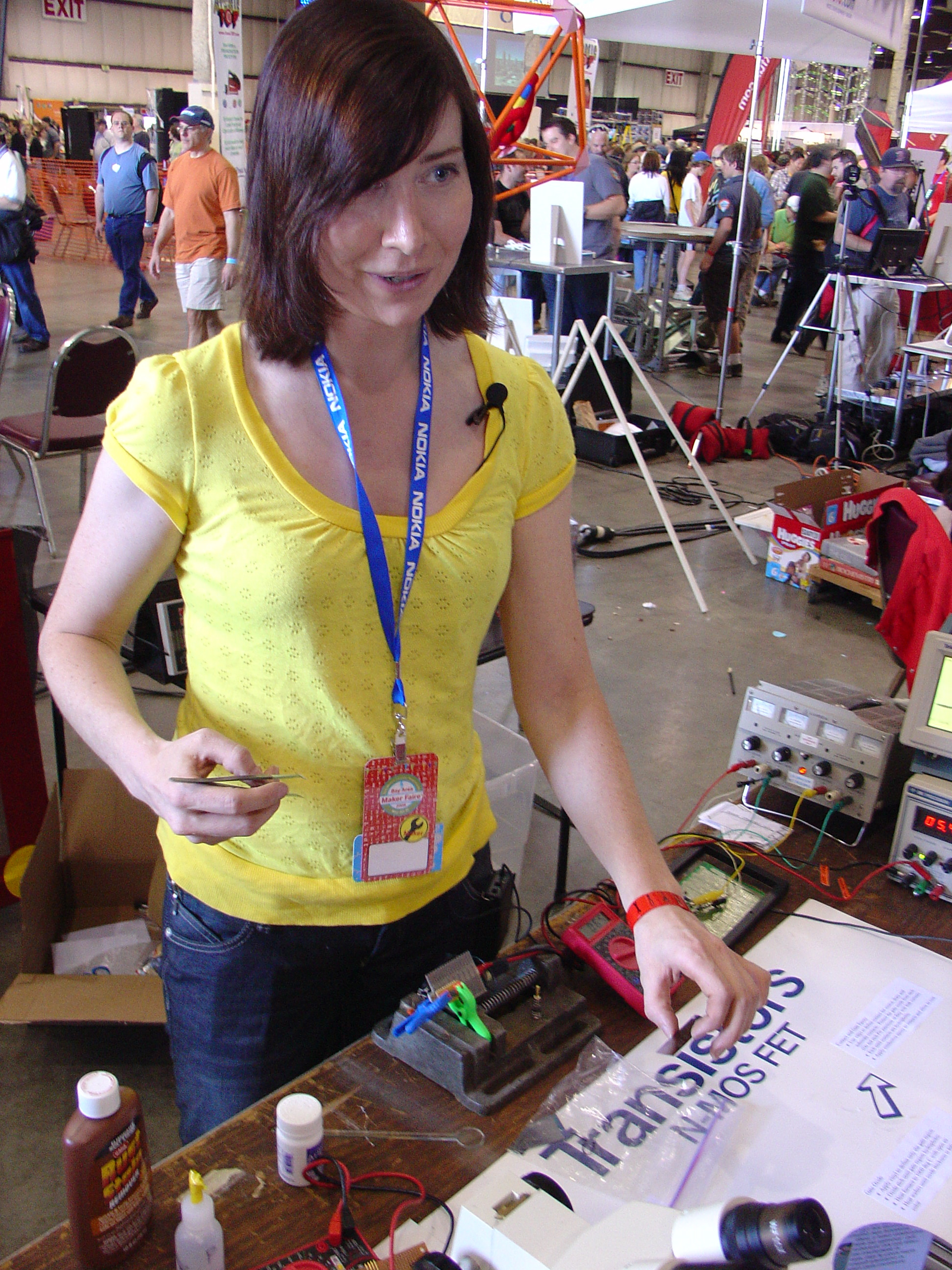
Autodidact computer programmer Jeri Ellsworth at a 2009 Bay Area "Maker Faire" conference

The history of women in engineering predates the development of the profession of engineering. Before engineering was recognised as a formal profession, women with engineering skills often sought recognition as inventors. During the Islamic Golden Period from the 8th century until the 15th century there were many Muslim women who were inventors and engineers, such as the 10th-century astrolabe maker Al-ʻIjliyyah.

In the 19th century, women who performed engineering work often had academic training in mathematics or science, although many of them were still not eligible to graduate with a degree in engineering, such as Ada Lovelace or Hertha Marks Ayrton. Rita de Morais Sarmento was one of the first women in Europe to be certified with an academic degree in engineering in 1896. In the United States at the University of California, Berkeley, Elizabeth Bragg (1876) and Julia Morgan (1894) already had received their bachelor's degree in that field.

In the early years of the 20th century, a few women were admitted to engineering training. Alice Perry (1906), Cécile Butticaz (1907), Elisa Leonida Zamfirescu (1912) and Nina Cameron Graham (1912) were some of the first European women to graduate with a degree in engineering. The entry of the United States into World War II created a serious shortage of engineering talent in America as men were drafted into the armed forces. The GE on-the-job engineering training for women with degrees in mathematics and physics, and the Curtiss-Wright Engineering Program had "Curtiss-Wright Cadettes" ("Engineering Cadettes", e.g., Rosella Fenton). The company partnered with Cornell, Penn State, Purdue, the University of Minnesota, the University of Texas, RPI, and Iowa State University to create an engineering curriculum that eventually enrolled over 600 women. The course lasted ten months and focused primarily on aircraft design and production.

Kathleen McNulty, Betty Holberton, Marlyn Wescoff, Ruth Lichterman, Betty Jean Jennings and Fran Bilas were the first six programmers of the ENIAC. Georgia Tech began to admit women engineering students in 1952. The Massachusetts Institute of Technology (MIT) had graduated its first female student, Ellen Swallow Richards (1842–1911), in 1873. The École Polytechnique in Paris first began to admit women students in 1972. The number of BA/BS degrees in engineering awarded to women in the U.S. increased by 45 percent between 1980 and 1994. However, from 1984 to 1994, the number of women graduating with a BA or BS degree in computer science decreased by 23 percent.

The Afghan Girls Robotics Team made history in 2017, following their love of engineering and robotics to take part in the FIRST Global Challenge in Washington, DC. Members of the team, aged 12 to 18, overcame war and other hardships in the quest for national pride and as a symbol of a more Progressive Afghanistan. But the overthrowing of the Afghanistan government by the Taliban in August 2021 left the girls on the team fearful for their safety. On 21 August 2021 it was reported that nine Afghan girl robotics team members were safe in Qatar, having made it out of Kabul. The girls on the team were offered scholarships at 'incredible universities' to pursue their careers in robotics and engineering.

== Terminology ==
Although the terms engineer and engineering date from the Middle Ages, they acquired their current meaning and usage only recently in the nineteenth century. Briefly, an engineer is one who uses the principles of engineering – namely acquiring and applying scientific, mathematical, economic, social, and practical knowledge – in order to design and build structures, machines, devices, systems, materials and processes. Some of the major branches of the engineering profession include civil engineering, military engineering, mechanical engineering, chemical engineering, electrical engineering, aerospace engineering, computer engineering, and biomedical engineering.

== Inventors ==
Before engineering was recognised as a formal profession, women with engineering skills often sought recognition as inventors. Tabitha Babbit (1784–1853?) was an American toolmaker who invented the first circular saw. Sarah Guppy (1770–1852) was an Englishwoman who patented a design for bridge foundations. Naval engineer Henrietta Vansittart (1833–1883) held patents across the world for the Lowe Vansittart propeller and was the first woman to write and illustrate her own diagrams and drawings for a scientific article presented at Association of Foreman Engineers and Draughtsmen. Mary Dixon Kies (1752–1837) was the first American woman to receive a patent for her method of weaving straw in 1809.

== 19th century: entry into technical professions ==
With the coming of the Industrial Revolution in the 19th century, new technology-based occupations opened up for both men and women. Sarah Bagley (1806–?) is remembered for her efforts to improve working conditions for women mill workers in Lowell, Massachusetts in the 1830s and 1840s, and for being one of the earliest women to work as a telegraph operator. Mathilde Fibiger (1830–1872), a Danish novelist and advocate of women's rights, became a telegraph operator for the Danish State Telegraph system in the 1860s.

Engineering began to be taught as a formal academic discipline in the late 18th and early 19th centuries. The École Polytechnique in France was established in 1794 to teach military and civil engineering; West Point Military Academy in the United States established a program modelled after the École Polytechnique in 1819. Rensselaer Polytechnic Institute (RPI) began to teach civil engineering in 1828. However, none of these institutions admitted women as students at the time of their founding.

In the 19th century, women who performed engineering work often had academic training in mathematics or science. Ada Lovelace (1815–1852), Lord Byron's daughter, was privately schooled in mathematics before beginning the collaboration with Charles Babbage on his analytical engine. Hertha Marks Ayrton (1854–1923), a British engineer and inventor who helped develop electric arc lighting, studied mathematics at Cambridge in 1880, but was denied a degree, as women were only granted certificates of completion at the time. Consequently, she moved to the University of London, which granted her a bachelor of Science degree in 1881. Mary Engle Pennington (1872–1952), an American chemist and refrigeration engineer, completed the requirements for a BS degree in chemistry at the University of Pennsylvania in 1892, but was given a certificate of proficiency instead.

Elizabeth Bragg and Julia Morgan became the first women to receive a bachelor's degree in engineering, by the University of California, Berkeley, in civil engineering (1876) and mechanical engineering (1894). Bertha Lamme graduated from Ohio State University in mechanical engineering in 1894.

In 1882 Mary Hegeler Carus was the first woman to graduate in engineering from the University of Michigan. She went on to study at the Bergakademie Freiberg from 1885 to 1886, the first woman to be legally enrolled. While studying at Freiberg, Hegeler was segregated to her own private laboratory due to the administration's concern that she would distract male students. Although her academic performance was excellent, she was not allowed to officially graduate because she was a woman. She went on to run the family business, Matthiessen-Hegeler Zinc Company in La Salle, at one time the largest producer of zinc in the US.

Rita de Morais Sarmento (1872–1931) was the first woman to earn an engineering degree in Europe. She enrolled at the Academia Politécnica do Porto to study civil engineering of public works, which she concluded with various distinctions in 1894. Two years later, she was granted with the "Civil Engineering certificate of capability" to practise as a professional engineer, and although she never did, she was the first formally and fully recognised European woman engineer.

Lydia Weld was the first woman to graduate in engineering from the Massachusetts Institute of Technology, starting her studies in 1898 and going on to work as a draughtsman in the engineering division of Newport News Shipbuilding and Dry Dock Company. She later became the second woman member of the American Society of Mechanical Engineers.

Other women in engineering in the same time period include three Danish women: Agnes Klingberg, Betzy Meyer and Julie Arenholt, who studied from 1897 to 1901 at the Polyteknisk Læreanstalt, today known as the Danmarks Tekniske Universitet.

Women without formal engineering degrees were also integral to great 19th century civil engineering feats. Emily Warren Roebling is recognised as managing the construction of the Brooklyn Bridge, and was the first person to cross the bridge at its opening ceremony in 1883. Roebling's husband, Washington, worked as the chief engineer for the Brooklyn Bridge project until he fell ill of decompression sickness. Emily Warren Roebling then assumed her husband's duties at the project site, and taught herself about material properties, cable construction, calculating catenary curves and other subjects.

== 20th century: entry into engineering programs ==
In the early years of the twentieth century, a small number of women had begun to be admitted to engineering training courses.

=== 1900s ===
On 27 July 1904, Maria Elisabeth Bes graduated in chemical engineering from the Polytechische School te Delft, becoming the first female graduate engineer in the Netherlands.

In 1906, Anna Boyksen became the first female engineering student at the Technische Hochschule München in Germany.

In 1905, Nora Stanton Blatch Barney (1883–1971), daughter of Harriot Stanton Blatch and granddaughter of Elizabeth Cady Stanton, was the first woman to earn a degree in civil engineering from Cornell University. In the same year, she was accepted as a junior member of the American Society of Civil Engineers; however, twelve years later, after having worked as an engineer, architect, and engineering inspector, her request for an upgrade to associate membership was denied.

Olive Dennis (1885–1957), who became the second woman to graduate from Cornell with a civil engineering degree in 1920, was initially hired by the Baltimore and Ohio Railroad as a draftsman; she later became the first person to claim the title of Service Engineer when this title was created.

In 1907, Elin Jacobsson and Anna Sandstedt graduated from the Technical School in Stockholm as civil engineers, the first women to do so. They had to undertake the mandatory bricklaying part of the course in the "utmost secrecy" in the basement.

Cleone Benest passed the City and Guilds of London Institute's motor-engineering examination, the Royal Automobile Club's mechanical test in 1908 and took the Portsmouth Municipal College examination for heat engines in 1910. Using the professional name of C. Griff, she joined several engineering organisations and established a consultancy business in Mayfair.

Alice Perry was one of the first formally recognised women engineers in Europe, graduated with a degree in engineering in 1908 from Queen's College, Galway.

In 1908, Emma Strada was the first woman engineering graduate in Italy, coming third out of 62 in her class.

Elisa Leonida Zamfirescu (1887–1973) was refused admission by the School of Bridges and Roads in Bucharest, Romania due to prejudices against women in the sciences but in 1909, she was accepted at the Royal Academy of Technology in Berlin. She graduated from the university in 1912, with a degree in engineering, specialising in chemistry, becoming one of the earliest professional women engineers in the world.

=== 1910s ===
In 1911, the Higher Women's Polytechnical Courses in St. Petersburg, founded in 1906 through the efforts of Praskovia Arian, was granted university-level status alongside other Russian women's higher educational institutions. By 1916, about 50 female engineers had graduated from the institution.

Nina Cameron Graham graduated from University of Liverpool on 6 July 1912 with a degree in Civil Engineering, the first British woman to qualify as an engineer. She married a fellow student and moved to Canada. Maria Artini enrolled in the Polytechnic University of Milan in 1912, graduating in electrical engineering section in 1919 with a grade of 90/100. She was the second female graduate of the Polytechnic and the first female electrical engineering graduate in Italy.

In 1914 Vera Sandberg was the only woman among 500 male students at Chalmers University of Technology, in Gothenburg, graduating in 1917 to become Sweden's first woman engineer. She is now commemorated by a statue, two streets & a hot air balloon.

Yvonne Odic earned a degree in mechanical engineering followed by a degree in aerodynamics at the Nancy Electrotechnical Institute in France, and was working for Citroen at the start of World War I, when she moved into developing special steels in a large armament factory (usine de guerre) in Paris. Jeanne Guiot studied sciences at the University of Caen and was working on a PhD before the outbreak of World War I, when in 1917 she joined Compagnie des forges et aciéries de la marine et d'Homécourt (the French Navy's steelworks) as an engineer, where she worked on cutting-edge research in energy, thermodynamics and blast furnaces. In 2026, it was announced that both Odic and Guiot were amongst the 72 historical women in STEM whose names have been proposed to be added to the 72 men already celebrated on the Eiffel Tower. The plan was announced by the Mayor of Paris, Anne Hidalgo following the recommendations of a committee led by Isabelle Vauglin of Femmes et Sciences and Jean-François Martins, representing the operating company which runs the Eiffel Tower.

In 1917 Elsbeth Steinheil became the first German woman to graduate in mechanical engineering, qualifying at the Technical University of Munich.

Edith Clarke, the inventor of the graphical calculator, was the first woman to earn a degree in MIT's electrical engineering department in 1918. Clarke also became the first woman admitted to the American Institute of Electrical Engineers, the precursor to the IEEE. She taught at the University of Texas Austin, where she was the only woman faculty member in the engineering department.

Elisa Bachofen was the first female civil engineer in Argentina, graduating from the University of Buenos Aires in 1918. Her sister Esther Elena Bachofen (1895–1943) followed in her footsteps and became the fourth female civil engineer in Argentina, qualifying in 1922.

In 1919, in the United Kingdom, the first engineering society for women was founded - the Women's Engineering Society or WES as it is commonly known - and it is still active today, continuing to support women in engineering. Founders included Lady Katharine Parsons, who was instrumental in the engineering work of her husband Sir Charles Parsons, their daughter and first President of WES Rachel Parsons, house builder and suffragette, Laura Annie Willson, Eleanor Shelley-Rolls, Margaret Rowbotham, Margaret, Lady Moir, with Caroline Haslett the founding Secretary.

Justicia Acuña was the first woman in Chile to qualify as a civil engineer, graduating from the University of Chile in 1919. She went on to work Department of Roads and Works of the Empresa de los Ferrocarriles del Estado. Since 1991, the Justicia Acuña Mena Award has been awarded every two years to an outstanding woman engineer in the practice of her profession.

Anne-Marcelle Schrameck became the first French woman engineer to graduate from l'École nationale supérieure des mines de Saint-Étienne (the National School of Mines of Saint-Étienne), in 1919. She was the only woman to attend for 50 years as the rules were changed after her entry due to concerns of the suitability of women undertaking mining internships.

Loughborough College (now University) admitted the first cohort of women engineers in 1919, including mechanical engineer Verena Holmes and engineer, writer and traveller Claudia Parsons.

=== 1920s ===
Juana Pereyra graduated from the Faculty of Engineering of the Universidad de la República in Uruguay, with the title of Ingeniera de Puentes y Caminos (Engineer of Bridges and Roads) in November 1920, making her one of the first female engineers in South America.

Adele Racheli graduated in industrial mechanical engineering from the Polytechnic University of Milan in 1920, the first woman to graduate from the course. In 1925, she opened a patent protection office Racheli & Bossi Patent Office in Milan, in partnership with a colleague Rosita Bossi, who graduated from the Polytechnic University of Milan in Electrotechnics in 1924.

In 1921, Sébastienne Guyot (1894–1941) graduated in mechanics and engineering from the Central School of Paris in the first year group to allow women as students. She became an aeronautical engineer, ending her career as Head of the Helicopter Service at the French Arsenal de l'Aéronautique.

In 1922, Marguerite Massart graduated from the Université Libre de Bruxelles with a degree in civil engineering, making her the first woman to qualify as an engineer in Belgium. She later set up a successful foundry business in Ghent and introduced a desalinisation project and early solar panels in the first hotel on Sal Island in Cape Verde. Hélène Mallebrancke was the first female Belgian civil engineering graduate from University of Ghent, later keeping the Allied telecommunications networks in the Ghent region operational against huge odds during World War Two for which she was decorated posthumously by both the French government and the Belgian authorities.

Kathleen M. Butler was the first member of staff appointed to the Sydney Harbour Bridge team in 1922, acting as the project manager for the large international engineering project in Australia.

On 30 June 1923, Marie Schneiderová-Zubaníková became the first woman in Czechoslovakia to graduate in civil engineering, from the Czech Technical University in Prague. Germaine Benoit graduated in chemical engineering in 1923 from the Institut de chimie appliquée and on 1 June 1924 joined the Pasteur Institute.

In 1925, Annette Ashberry was the first woman to be elected to the UK Society of Engineers and delivered the first address by a woman to the Society's members on 1 November 1926.

Li Fu Lee was the first Chinese woman to attend the Massachusetts Institute of Technology (MIT), starting in 1925, and graduating in electrical engineering in 1929.

In 1927, Elsie Eaves was the first woman admitted to full membership to the American Society of Civil Engineers. Martha Schneider-Bürger became the first German female civil engineer, graduating from Technische Hochschule Munich, a predecessor of Technical University of Munich in 1927. Greta Woxén (née Westberg) became Sweden's first female civil engineer when she graduated from the Kungliga Tekniska högskolan (the Royal Institute of Technology) in 1928.

=== 1930s ===
The first woman to earn a civil engineering degree in Mexico was Concepción Mendizábal Mendoza in 1930.

Rachel Shalon (Hebrew: רחל שלון) graduated in structural engineerings from the Technion in Haifa in 1930, becoming the first woman engineer in what was then Mandatory Palestine and later Israel. She was made a professor of structural engineering in 1960 and was the first of all Technion graduates, male or female, to reach the rank of full professor.

Marcelle Lafont graduated from l'école de chimie de Lyon as a chemical engineer in 1930, taking up work in the Bertholus airography factory in Caluire and later joining her family business, the Adolphe Lafont company.

Yun Hao “Ruth” Feng studied chemical engineering at Ohio State University in the late 1920s, graduating with a PhD in 1931. She was the first female engineering PhD graduate in the United States. She later worked in the fiber industry in China.

Ying Hsi Yuan trained as a Civil Engineer in Peiping in the 1930s and worked in bridge design in China before taking a postgraduate engineering degree in University of Liverpool in the 1940s, later working in Hong Kong.

In 1931, Asta Hampe received her diploma in telecommunications engineering from the Technische Hochschule in Berlin, going on to work in a range of engineering work in the next two decades, although she was fired from her job for being a woman when the Nazis came to power in 1933. She later became a professor of economics.

Marie Louise Compernolle was the first female Flemish chemical engineer, graduating in 1932 with a PhD in chemical engineering from Ghent University, the first female PhD in engineering from Ghent.

Sonja Lapajne Oblak came the first Slovenian woman to graduate as a civil engineer from the Faculty of Technology in Ljubljana in 1932, calculating the world's first corridor-free, reinforced concrete school building in 1936, before becoming Slovenia' first urban planner.

In 1932 Izzet Orujova graduated from the Azerbaijan State Oil and Industry University in Baku as a petrochemical technologist and worked there until 1959, researching new methods for producing oil additives She earned a doctorate in 1947 and become a professor and director of the Institute of Inorganic and Physical Chemistry of the Academy of Sciences of the Azerbaijan Soviet Socialist Republic. She is considered Azerbaijan's first female oil engineer.

Isabel Ebel earned her degree in aeronautical engineering at the Massachusetts Institute of Technology in 1932, the first woman to graduate there in the subject. The same year she helped plot Amelia Earhart's route for one of her record breaking flights, and Earhart repaid the favour by supporting Ebel's entry into Guggenheim School of Engineering at New York University, where Edel was also the first woman to study aeronautical engineering.

Hürriyet Sırmaçek graduated from the Istanbul Technical University as Turkey's first bridge engineer in 1935, going on to have a long career as a bridge and structural engineer.

In 1935, Gjuvara Noerieva graduated from the Metallurgical Faculty of the Leningrad Polytechnic Institute, the first Azerbaijani woman to be a professional metallurgist, and the first Azerbaijani woman to work in the metallurgical industry.

Andrée Hoppilliard graduated from the École polytechnique féminine in 1935 as an aeronautical engineer, and worked on the Gaucher RG.40 Week-End light aircraft. Marie-Louise Paris, EPF's founder, considered her “one of her most brilliant former students”.

Virginia Sink graduated as a chemical engineer from the University of Colorado in 1936, finishing in the top three of her class. She went to work for Chrysler where in 1938 she became the first woman to graduate with a masters in engineering from the Chrysler Institute of Engineering and was the first woman automotive engineer at Chrysler.

Beatriz Ghirelli graduated as a Mechanical and Electrical Engineer in 1938, the first woman to graduate in the subject from National University of La Planta, and the second woman in Argentina to earn the qualification.

In 1939, Isabel Gago graduated from Lisbon's Instituto Superior Técnico, one of the first two women to graduate in the field of chemical engineering in Portugal. She was the second woman to graduate and then work in engineering in Portugal (the first was Maria Amélia Chaves, the first woman to graduate in civil engineering) . Gago was the first woman to teach chemical engineering, spending her career at her alma mater.

== 1940s ==
=== World War II engineering programs for women ===
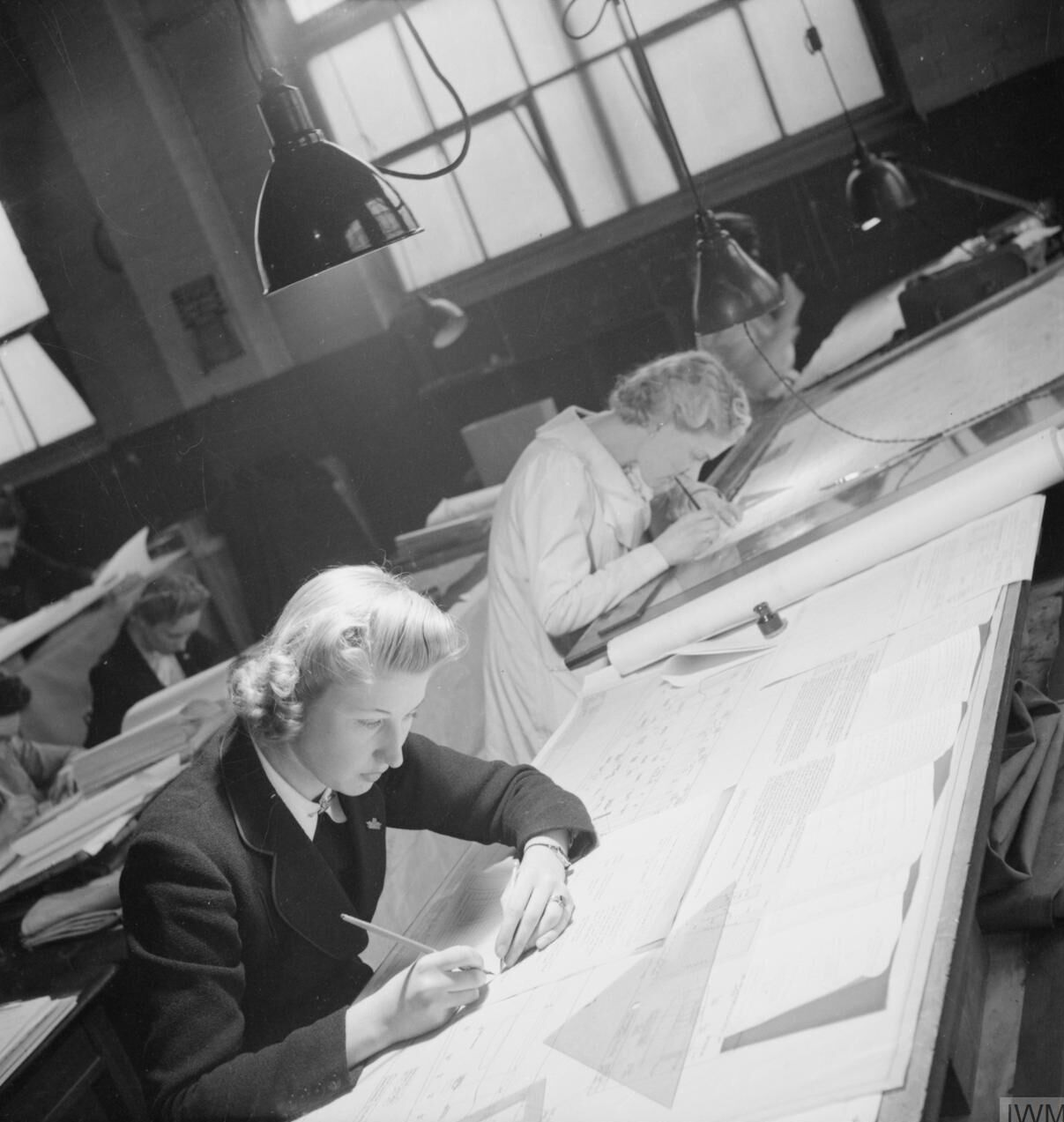
Draughtswomen at work on the Handley Page Halifax heavy bomber (1942)

The entry of the United States into World War II created a serious shortage of engineering talent in that country as men were drafted into the armed forces at the same time that industry ramped up production of armaments, battleships, and airplanes. The U.S. Office of Education initiated a series of courses in science and engineering that were open to women as well as men.

Private programs for women included GE on-the-job engineering training for women with degrees in mathematics and physics, and the Curtiss-Wright Engineering Program had Curtiss-Wright Cadettes (e.g. Rosella Fenton). The company partnered with Cornell, Penn State, Purdue, the University of Minnesota, the University of Texas, RPI, and Iowa State University to create an engineering curriculum that eventually enrolled over 600 women. The course lasted ten months and focused primarily on aircraft design and production.

Thelma Estrin (1924–2014), who would later become a pioneer in the fields of computer science and biomedical engineering, took a 1942 three-month engineering assistant course at Stevens Institute of Technology and earned University of Wisconsin BSc, MSc, and PhD degrees.

Ayyalasomayajula Lalitha graduated from the College of Engineering, Guindy in 1943 with a degree in electrical engineering, becoming India's first woman engineer, going on to have a long and successful career. She studied alongside P.K. Thressia and Leelamma Koshie (née George) making them first women engineering students in India.

Through an accelerated program brought on by the war, Lois Graham (1925–2013) graduated from Rensselaer Polytechnic Institute in 1946 and was the first woman in the United States to receive a Ph.D. in mechanical engineering from Illinois Institute of Technology (M.S. ME 1949, Ph.D. 1959).

=== Postwar era ===
In 1943, the United States Army authorized a secret project at the University of Pennsylvania's Moore School of Electrical Engineering to develop an electronic computer to compute artillery firing tables for the Army's Ballistic Research Laboratory. The project, which came to be known as ENIAC, or Electronic Numerical Integrator and Computer, was completed in 1946.

Previous to the development of the ENIAC, the U.S. Army had employed women trained in mathematics to calculate artillery trajectories, at first using mechanical desk calculators and later the differential analyzer developed by Vannevar Bush, at the Moore School. In 1945, one of these "computers", Kathleen McNulty (1921–2006), was selected to be one of the original programmers of the ENIAC, together with Frances Spence (1922–2012), Betty Holberton (1917–2001), Marlyn Wescoff, Ruth Lichterman (1924–1986), and Betty Jean Jennings (1924–2011). McNulty, Holberton, and Jennings would later work on the UNIVAC, the first commercial computer developed by the Remington Rand Corporation in the early 1950s.

Rebeca Uribe Bone became the first woman to graduate in engineering in Colombia in 1945, from the Pontifical-Bolivarian University of Medellin. She went on to work as a chemical engineer in the Bavaria brewing company. In 1948, her sister Guillermina Uribe Bone became the first woman to receive a degree in civil engineering from the Faculty of Mathematics and Engineering of the National University of Colombia in Bogotá.

In 1946, Hattie Scott Peterson gained a degree in civil engineering, believed to be the first African-American woman to do so. In 1947, UK engineer Mary Thompson Irvine became the first woman to be elected a chartered member of the Institution of Structural Engineers.

Ángela Alessio Robles, a Mexican civil engineer and town planner became Director General of Planning for the capital of Mexico City, and then the President of Planning and Director of the Plan for Urban Development in the city in the 1940s and 1950s, having graduated from the Escuela Nacional de Ingenieros (School of Engineering) in the Universidad Nacional Autónoma de México in 1943. She later moved to Monterrey and oversaw the development of the Macroplaza there, one of the largest plazas in the world and the largest in Mexico.

== 1950s ==
Nohemy Chaverra was the first Afro-Colombian woman to graduate with a degree in chemical engineering in Colombia. She graduated from the University of Antioquia in 1951. Her son, Andrés Palacio Chaverra, was Vice-Minister of Labour Relations between 2007 and 2008.

In 1950 Marianna Sankiewicz-Budzyńska graduated with a master's degree in electrical engineering, specialising in radio technology from Gdańsk University of Technology and went on to earn a PhD and become an academic, having a strong influence on the development of electrophonics in Poland and Eastern Europe. Elfriede Tungl became the first woman in Austria to earn a doctorate in civil engineering in 1950. In 1973 she became the first female associate professor at the Vienna University of Technology.

In 1952, Polish electrical engineer Maria Wanda Jastrzębska earned a master's degree in electronics and went on to set up early computer labs and influence university teaching.

Ila Ghose (née Majumdar) was West Bengal's first woman engineer, graduating as a mechanical engineer from the Bengali Engineering College in 1951. Sudhira Das qualified as the first female engineer in the Indian state of Odisha in the early 1950s.

California Odha Zertuche Díaz was the first woman to graduate from the UNAM School of Engineering, National Autonomous University of Mexico in 1954, and later was the primary developer of the drinking water and sewerage system in Ensenada, Mexico.

Dorothy Hatfield became the first female indentured engineering apprentice at Vickers-Armstrongs (Aircraft), Brooklands, UK in 1956, and in 1958 Janet Gulland became the first female graduate apprentice at the company.

In 1957, Araceli Sánchez Urquijo became the first female civil engineer to work in Spain, having been amongst the first 45 hydropower engineers trained at the Moscow Power Engineering Institute. The same year, Evelyna Bloem Souto was the only woman in the first class of the civil engineering course at the University of São Paulo in São Carlos, Brazil, before building a successful academic career.

From 1958, Laurel van der Wal was the project engineer on three MIA (Mouse-in-Able) launches from Cape Canaveral, as head of bioastronautics at Space Technology Laboratories. She was named the Los Angeles Times's "1960 Woman of the Year in Science" for her work, going on to be the first woman appointed to the Los Angeles Board of Airport Commissioners, in 1961, and served as a commissioner until 1967. In 1968, she served as Los Angeles International Airport's planner.

Premala Sivaprakasapillai Sivasegaram studied engineering at Somerville College, Oxford in the 1960s and became the first female engineer of Sri Lanka.

In 1962, Steve Shirley founded software company Freelance Programmers with a capital of £6, (later FI, then Xansa, since acquired by Steria and now part of the Sopra Steria Group). Having experienced sexism in her workplace, "being fondled, being pushed against the wall", she wanted to create job opportunities for women with dependents, and predominantly employed women, with only three male programmers in the first 300 staff, until the Sex Discrimination Act 1975 made that practice illegal. She also adopted the name "Steve" to help her in the male-dominated business world, given that company letters signed using her real name were not responded to. Her team's projects included programming Concorde's black box flight recorder.

The first International Conference of Women Engineers and Scientists was held in New York in 1964, organised by the US Society of Women Engineers and attended by 493 women from 35 countries. The second International Conference of Women Engineers and Scientists followed in 1967 in Cambridge, UK, organised by the Women's Engineering Society with 309 attendees from 35 countries. Conferences have been held every three to four years since.

== 1950s–1970s ==
The Cold War and the space race between the United States and the Soviet Union created additional demands for trained engineering talent in the 1950s and 1960s. Many engineering schools in the U.S. that had previously admitted only male students began to tentatively adopt coeducation. After 116 years as an all-male institution, RPI began to admit small numbers of female students in the 1940s. Georgia Tech began to admit women engineering students in 1952, but only in programs not available in other state universities. It would be 1968 before women were admitted to all courses offered by Georgia Tech.

The Massachusetts Institute of Technology (MIT) had graduated its first female student, Ellen Swallow Richards (1842–1911) in 1873; she later became an instructor at MIT. However, until the 1960s, MIT enrolled few female engineering students, due in part to a lack of housing for women students. After the completion of the first women's dormitory on campus, McCormick Hall, in 1964, the number of women enrolled increased greatly. Influenced in part by the second wave feminism movement of the late 1960s and 1970s, female faculty members at MIT, including Mildred Dresselhaus and Sheila Widnall, began to actively promote the cause of women's engineering education.

In 1964, Nicole Laroche became the first female Gadzarts (engineering student) at the French École nationale supérieure d'arts et métiers (ENSAM).

Civil engineer P.K. Thressia was appointed India's first female chief engineer (for the state of Kerala) in 1971, having graduated from the College of Engineering, Guindy (CEG) in 1944.

The École Polytechnique in Paris first began to admit women students in 1972.

Margaret Hamilton is also notable for her contributions to computer and aerospace engineering in the 1970s. Hamilton, the director of the Software Engineering Division of the MIT Instrumentation Laboratory at the time, is famous for her work in writing the on-board guidance code for the Apollo 11 mission.

In 1977, Laura Irasuegi Otal joined the Spanish Colegio de Ingenieros de Caminos, Canales y Puertos del País Vasco, the first Basque woman to do so. She had studied civil engineering at the Moscow Power Engineering Institute immediately after the Second World War as a Niños de Rusia child refugee and returned to Spain in 1956. She had to complete the conversion of her civil engineering qualifications to fit Spanish requirements, which took some years.

== 1980s–1990s ==
As more engineering programs were opened to women, the number of women enrolled in engineering programs increased dramatically. The number of BA/BS degrees in engineering awarded to women in the U.S. increased by 45 percent between 1980 and 1994. However, during the period of 1984–1994, the number of women graduating with a BA/BS degree in computer science decreased by 23 percent (from 37 percent of graduates in 1984 to 28 percent in 1994). This phenomenon became known as "The incredible shrinking pipeline", from the title of a 1997 paper on the subject by Tracy Camp, a professor in the Department of Mathematical and Computer Sciences at the Colorado School of Mines.

Some of the reasons for the decline cited in the paper included:

- The development of computer games designed and marketed for males only;
- A perception that computer science was the domain of "hacker/nerd/antisocial" personality types;
- Gender discrimination in computing;
- Lack of role models at the university level.

In 1993, Eveline Gottzein was the first woman to be awarded the Werner von Siemens Ring, one of the highest awards for technical sciences in Germany.

== Statistics ==
=== United States ===
According to studies by the National Science Foundation, the percentage of BA/BS degrees in engineering awarded to women in the U.S. increased steadily from 0.4 percent in 1966 to a peak of 20.9 percent in 2002, and then dropped off slightly to 18.5 percent in 2008. However, the trend identified in "The incredible shrinking pipeline" has continued; the percentage of BA/BS degrees in mathematics and computer science awarded to women peaked in 1985 at 39.5 percent, and declined steadily to 25.3 percent in 2008.

The percentage of master's degrees in engineering awarded to women increased steadily from 0.6 percent in 1966 to 22.9 percent in 2008. The percentage of doctoral degrees in engineering awarded to women during the same period increased from 0.3 percent to 21.5 percent.

=== Australia ===
Only 9.6% of engineers in Australia are women, and the rate of women in engineering degree courses has remained around 14% since the 1990s.

=== United Kingdom ===
The percentage of female and technology engineering graduates rose from 7 percent in 1984 to 14.6 percent in 2018. The proportion of engineers in industry who are women is, on the other hand, still very low at around 11.8% – the lowest percentage in the EU.

== Initiatives to promote engineering to women ==
- Alpha Omega Epsilon
- Anita Borg Institute for Women and Technology
- Grace Hopper Celebration of Women in Computing
- International Women in Engineering Day (INWED)
- Robogals
- The Society of Women Engineers
- Women in SET
- Women in Technology International
- Women's Engineering Society
- WIE – Women in Engineering Network
- WEPAN – Women in Engineering ProActive Network Inc.
- WISE – Women into Science, Engineering, and Construction

== See also ==
- Women in engineering
- African women in engineering
- History of women in engineering in the United Kingdom
- List of prizes, medals, and awards for women in engineering
- Women in computing
- Women in science
- Category:Women in technology
- Women in the workforce
