= Cécile Butticaz =

Swiss engineer (1884-1966)

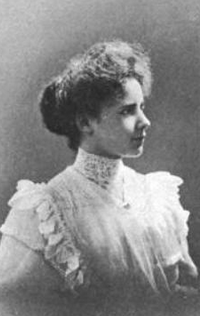
- Cécile Butticaz, from a 1907 publication.
- Born: 2 July 1884; Geneva
- Died: 1 June 1966 (aged 81); Geneva
- Occupation: Engineer

Cécile Butticaz (2 July 1884, in Geneva – 1 June 1966, in Geneva), also known as Cécile Biéler or Cécile Biéler-Butticaz, was a Swiss engineer. She is considered the first female electrical engineer in Europe, because she earned her engineering diploma in 1907.

== Early life ==
Butticaz was born in 1884, in Geneva, the daughter of Constant Butticaz and Eugénie Mercanton Butticaz. Her father was a factory director.

Butticaz studied at the University of Geneva and then at EPFL a prestigious Swiss engineering university, from which she was also first female graduate. She earned a diploma in electrical engineering in 1907, the first woman to do so in Europe. She earned a doctorate in physics from the University of Geneva, in 1929, after conducting original research on invar, a nickel-iron alloy with industrial applications.

== Career ==
Butticaz worked as an engineer in Geneva after she gained her diploma. She also taught mathematics in Geneva and Lausanne. She wrote and published several books of poetry in French. She also wrote on social matters, in Foyer moderne (1935).

Butticaz is sometimes described as the first woman engineer in Europe, but there are several women with claims to that "first". Among earlier contenders, Rita de Morais Sarmento earned an engineering degree in Portugal in 1896, and Alice Perry earned her engineering degree in Ireland in 1905.

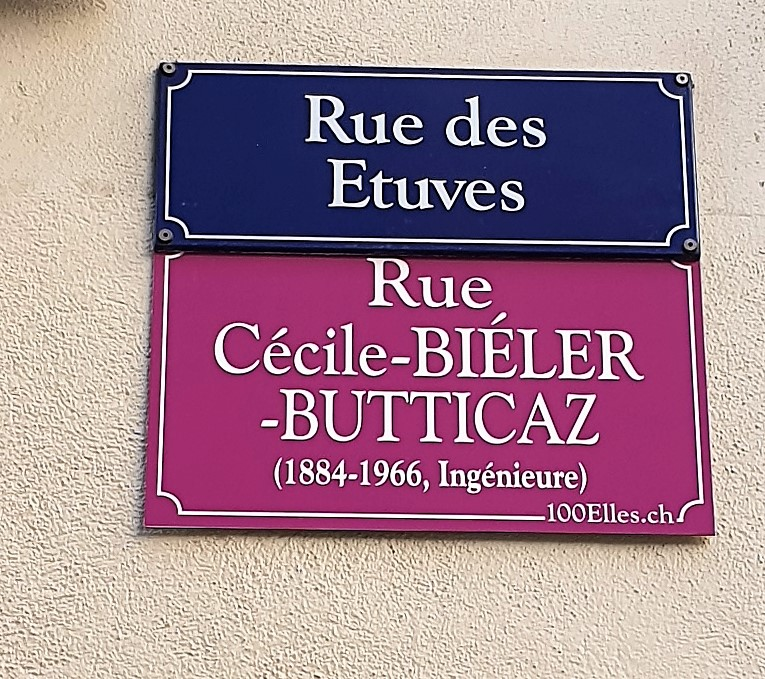
A street sign marking Rue Cécile-Biéler-Butticaz.

== Personal life and legacy ==
Butticaz was a Soroptimist, active in founding the Lausanne chapter of the club. She used the names Cécile Biéler or Cécile Biéler-Butticaz after her marriage to Alfred Édouard François Biéler. They had three sons, born in the 1910s. She died in 1966, in Geneva, aged 81 years. Her grave is in Cully.
In 2019, due to the efforts of the 100Elles project, a street in Geneva was proposed for a rename as "Rue Cécile-Biéler-Butticaz", after the city's notable native engineer.
