= Van der Ploeg =

van der Ploeg is a Dutch surname meaning "from the plow". It can be a metonymic occupational surname, originally referring to a farmer or a bookbinder (a book binding cutter is known as a (snij)ploeg). Alternatively, it may be a toponymic surname, e.g., referring to a house with the sign of a plow. Notable people with the surname include:

- Johannes P. M. van der Ploeg (1909–2004), Dutch linguist and Old Testament scholar
- José van der Ploeg (born 1958), Spanish sailor
- Neil Van der Ploeg (born 1987), Australian cyclist
- Paul van der Ploeg (born 1989), Australian mountain biker
- Rick van der Ploeg (born 1956), Dutch economist

== See also ==
- Evert Ploeg (born 1963), Australian portrait painter
- Heidi Ploeg (born 1965), Canadian biomechanical engineer
- De Ploeg, an artist collective from the city of Groningen
