= Christine Q. Wu =

Chinese and Canadian mechanical engineer

Christine Qiong Wu is a retired Chinese and Canadian mechanical engineer whose research focused on the mechanics of moving vehicles, walking robots, and walking people. She is a lung cancer survivor, and in her retirement has worked as a lung cancer patient research advocate.

== Education and academic career ==
Wu has a 1986 bachelor's degree from Peking University. She moved to Canada for graduate study, earned a master's degree from the University of British Columbia in 1990, and completed a Ph.D. from the University of Manitoba in 1996.

After completing her Ph.D., she remained on the University of Manitoba faculty, becoming a professor of mechanical engineering. She was given the NSERC/MCI Industrial Research Chair in Heavy Ground Vehicles and Transportation Equipment in 2012. She served as president of the Canadian Society for Mechanical Engineering for 2012–2014.

== Cancer diagnosis and activism ==
Wu went on leave from her faculty position in 2015, after a diagnosis of lung cancer. Although never a smoker herself, she has worked to publicize the connection between smoking and lung cancer. She celebrated the eight-year anniversary of her diagnosis, and five-year anniversary of having a stable diagnosis, in 2023. She has also begun work as the leader of a research team for the Canadian Cancer Society.

== Recognition ==
Wu was named a Fellow of the Canadian Society for Mechanical Engineering (CSME) in 2009, and a Fellow of the American Society of Mechanical Engineers in 2014.

She was the 2016 recipient of the C. N. Downing Award of the CSME, and of the Judith Weiszmann Women in Engineering Champion Award of Engineers Geoscientists Manitoba.

In 2019 the International Association for the Study of Lung Cancer gave her their Advocate Travel Award in recognition of her work in lung cancer education and advocacy.
