= Elisa Bachofen =

Argentinian engineer

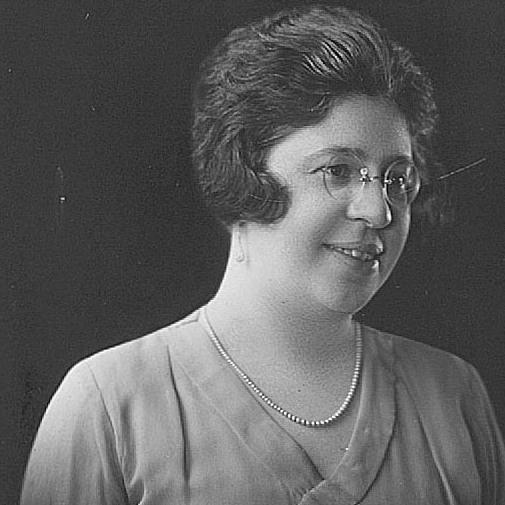
- Born: Elisa Beatriz Bachofen; 1891; Buenos Aires, Argentina
- Died: 19 November 1976 (aged 84–85)
- Education: University of Buenos Aires
- Occupation: Engineer
- Known for: First female civil engineer in Latin America

Elisa Beatriz Bachofen was the first female civil engineer in Argentina and Latin America.

== Biography ==
Elisa Beatriz Bachofen was born in Buenos Aires, Argentina, in 1891. She graduated from the University of Buenos Aires in 1918. Her thesis was on the manufacturing of cotton yarns and fabrics. It has since been digitised. She was the secretary for and wrote articles in the UBA student magazine Revista Del Centro Estudiantes de Ingenieria.

She was lead author on Usina hidroeléctrica de Luján de Cuyo : memoria descriptiva de la misma about the Luján de Cuyo hydroelectric plant.

Her career spanned the first half of the twentieth century. From 1919 to 1953, when she retired, she worked for the Dirección de Puentes y Caminos as a bridge designer, and later for the Dirección Nacional de Vialidad overseeing the development and direction of road works.

She chaired the Technical Commission of the Circle of Inventors founded in 1922, and the Argentine Association of Scientific and Technical Libraries. She was a member of the Board of Directors of the Association of Business and Professional Women.

Along with her academic achievements she was also active in the National Feminist Union, together with activists such as Alicia Moreau de Justo and Julieta Lanteri.

In 1955 she had to leave Argentina after the Revolución Libertadora in September, which ended the Peronist regime, continuing with her research and projects in the United States.

She travelled to Europe, the United States, Israel and Brazil.

Her sister Esther Bachofen (1895–1943) followed in her footsteps and became the fourth female civil engineer in Argentina, qualifying in 1922.

She died in Buenos Aires on the 19th of November 1976.

== Commemoration ==
In 2017 Public Street N° 1574 in the city of Paraná in the Entre Ríos province, was named "ELISA BACHOFEN". In the same year, residents of Buenos Aires voted to name a tunnel boring machine "Elisa" in her honour. It excavated a tunnel from Agronomía to the Río de la Plata in the basin of the Arroyo Vega.

In recognition of her life's work, on 12 and 13 November 2018, the Faculty of Engineering of the University of Buenos Aires, held the inaugural "Elisa Bachofen" Conference of Women Engineers.

In 2019, the Universidad Nacional de Rafaela established the Elisa Bachofen Scholarships as affirmative action measure to encourage the entry and retention of women in the engineering sector as part of their work to reduce the gender gap in technological fields.

In July 2021 a ÑuSat satellite, part of a series of Argentinean commercial Earth observation satellites built and operated by Satellogic, was named Elisa Bachofen, and launched alongside three others named after historical women STEM pioneers Rosalind Franklin, Grace Hopper and Sofya Kovalevskaya.

== See also ==
- Justicia Acuña - first Chilean woman graduated as a civil engineer in 1919.
- Juana Pereyra - Uruguayan civil engineer - graduated 1920.
- Rebeca Uribe Bone - the first woman to graduate in engineering in Colombia - in 1945.
