= Women in engineering =

Women in the academic and professional fields of engineering

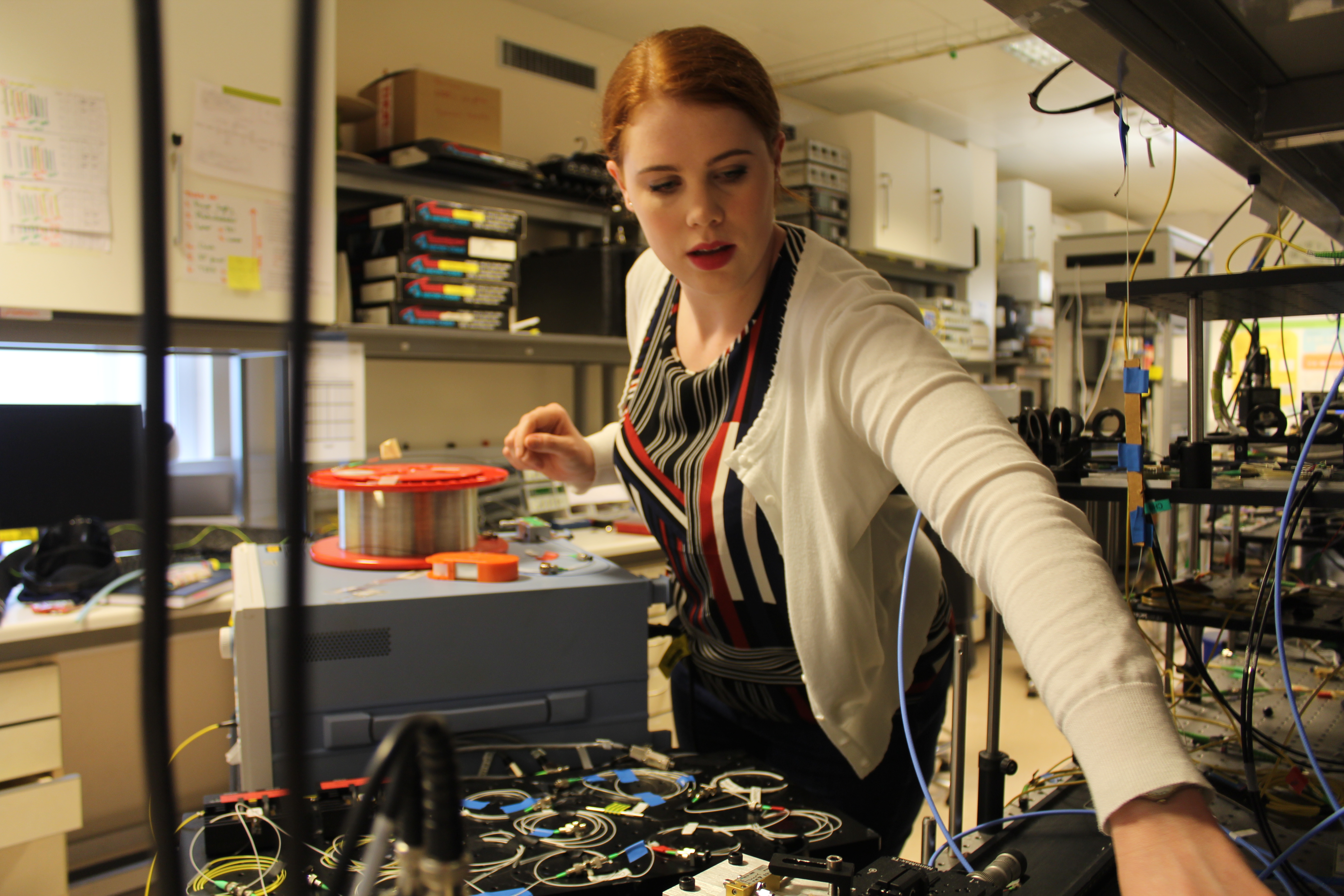
A female engineer working on an optical communications system test.

Women are often under-represented in the academic and professional fields of engineering; however, many women have contributed to the diverse fields of engineering historically and currently. A number of organizations and programs have been created to understand and overcome this tradition of gender disparity. Some have decried this gender gap, saying that it indicates the absence of potential talent. Though the gender gap as a whole is narrowing, there is still a growing gap with minority women compared to their white counterparts. Gender stereotypes, low rates of female engineering students, and engineering culture are factors that contribute to the current situation where men dominate in fields relating to engineering sciences.

== History ==
The history of women as designers and builders of machines and structures predates the development of engineering as a profession. Prior to the creation of the term "engineer" in the 14th century, women had contributed to the technological advancement of societies around the globe. By the 19th century, women who participated in engineering work often had academic training in mathematics or science. Ada Lovelace was privately schooled in mathematics before beginning her collaboration with Charles Babbage on his analytical engine that would earn her the designation of the "first computer programmer." In the early years of the 20th century, greater numbers of women began to be admitted to engineering programs, but they were generally looked upon as anomalies by the men in their departments.

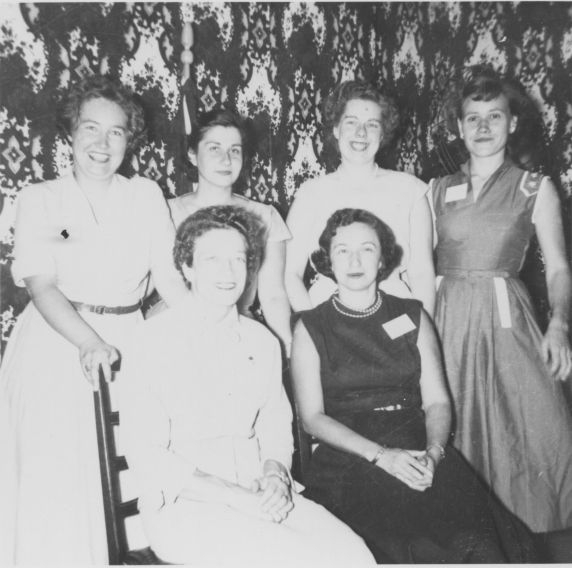
A 1953 Society of Women Engineers board meeting.

The first University to award an engineering's bachelor's degree for women was University of California, Berkeley. Elizabeth Bragg was the recipient of a bachelor's degree in civil engineering in 1876, becoming the first female engineer in the United States. Prior to the 19th century, it was very rare for women to earn a bachelor's degree in any field because they did not have the opportunity to enroll in universities due to gender disparities. Some universities started to admit women to their colleges by the early 1800s and by the mid-1800s they started to admit them into all academic programs including engineering.

In the United States, the entry into World War II created a serious shortage of engineering talent, as men were drafted into the armed forces. To address the shortage, initiatives like General Electric on-the-job engineering training for women with degrees in mathematics and physics and the Curtiss-Wright Engineering Program among others created new opportunities for women in engineering. Curtiss-Wright partnered with Cornell, Penn State, Purdue, the University of Minnesota, the University of Texas, Rensselaer Polytechnic Institute and Iowa State University to create an engineering curriculum that lasted ten months and focused primarily on aircraft design and production.

During this time, there were few public attacks on female engineers. Chiefly, these attacks were kept quiet inside institutions due to the fact that women did not pressure aggressively to shift the gender gap between men and women in the engineering field. Another reason why these “attacks” were kept private is due to how men believed that it was impossible for engineering to stop being a male-dominated field.

Women's roles in the workforce, specifically in engineering fields, changed greatly during the Post–World War II period. As women started to marry at later ages, have fewer children, divorce more frequently and stopped depending on male breadwinners for economic support, they started to become even more active in the engineering labor force despite the fact that their salaries were less than men's.

Women also played a crucial role in programming the ENIAC from its construction during the World War II period through the next several decades. Originally recruited by the Army in 1943, female ENIAC programmers made considerable advancements in programming techniques, such as the invention of breakpoints, now a standard debugging tool.

In addition to the wartime shortage of engineers, the number of women in engineering fields grew due to the gradual increase of public universities admitting female students. For example, Georgia Tech began to admit women engineering students in 1952, while the École Polytechnique in Paris, a premier French engineering institution, began to admit female students in 1972.

As a result, gender stereotypical roles have changed due to industrialization resolution.

== Factors contributing to lower female participation ==
=== Gender stereotypes ===
Stereotype threat may contribute to the under-representation of women in engineering. Because engineering is a traditionally male-dominated field, women may be less confident about their abilities, even when performing equally. At a young age, girls typically do not express the same level of interest in engineering as boys, possibly due in part to gender stereotypes. There is also significant evidence of the remaining presence of implicit bias against female engineers, due to the belief that men are mathematically superior and better suited to engineering jobs. The Implicit Association Test (IAT) shows that people subconsciously connect men with science and women with art, according to the results from over half a million people around the world between 1998 and 2010. This unconscious stereotype also has a negative impact on the performance of women. Women who persist are able to overcome these difficulties, enabling them to find fulfilling and rewarding experiences in the engineering profession.

Due to this gender bias, women's choice in entering an engineering field for college is also highly correlated to the background and exposure they have had with mathematics and other science courses during high school. Most women that do choose to study engineering regard themselves as better at these types of courses and as a result, they are capable of studying in a male-dominated field.

Women's self-efficacy is also a contributor to the gender stereotype that plays a role in the underrepresentation of women in engineering. Women's ability to think that they can be successful and perform well is correlated to the choices they make when choosing a college career. Women that show high self-efficacy personalities are more likely to choose to study in the engineering field. Self-efficacy is also correlated to gender roles because men often present higher self-efficacy than women, which can also be why when choosing a major most women opt to not choose the engineering major.

=== Lower rates of female students in engineering degree programs ===
Over the past few years, 40% of women have left the engineering field. There are many factors leading to this, such as being judged about going into a difficult major such as engineering, or working in difficult workplace conditions. According to the Society of Women Engineers one in four females leave the field after a certain age.

Women are under-represented in engineering education programs as in the workforce (see Statistics). Enrollment and graduation rates of women in post-secondary engineering programs are very important determinants of how many women go on to become engineers. Because undergraduate degrees are acknowledged as the "latest point of standard entry into scientific fields", the under-representation of women in undergraduate programs contributes directly to under-representation in scientific fields. Additionally, in the United States, women who hold degrees in science, technology, and engineering fields are less likely than their male counterparts to have jobs in those fields.

This degree disparity varies across engineering disciplines. Women tend to be more interested in the engineering disciplines that have societal and humane developments, such as agricultural and environmental engineering. They are therefore well-represented in environmental and biomedical engineering degree programs, receiving 40-50% of awarded degrees in the U.S. (2017–18), and are far less likely to receive degrees in fields like mechanical, electrical and computer engineering.

A study by the Harvard Business Review discussed the reasons why the rate of women in the engineering field is still low. The study discovered that rates of female students in engineering programs are continuous because of the collaboration aspects in the field. The results of the study chiefly determined how women are treated differently in group works in which there are more male than female members and how male members “excluded women from the real engineering work”. Aside from this, women in this study also described how professors treated female students differently “just because they were women”.

Despite the fact that fewer women enroll in engineering programs across the nation, the representation of women in STEM-based careers can increase when college and university administrators work on implementing mentoring programs and work-life policies for women. Research shows that these rates are difficult to increase since women are judged as less competent than men to perform supposedly “masculine jobs”.

=== Engineering culture ===
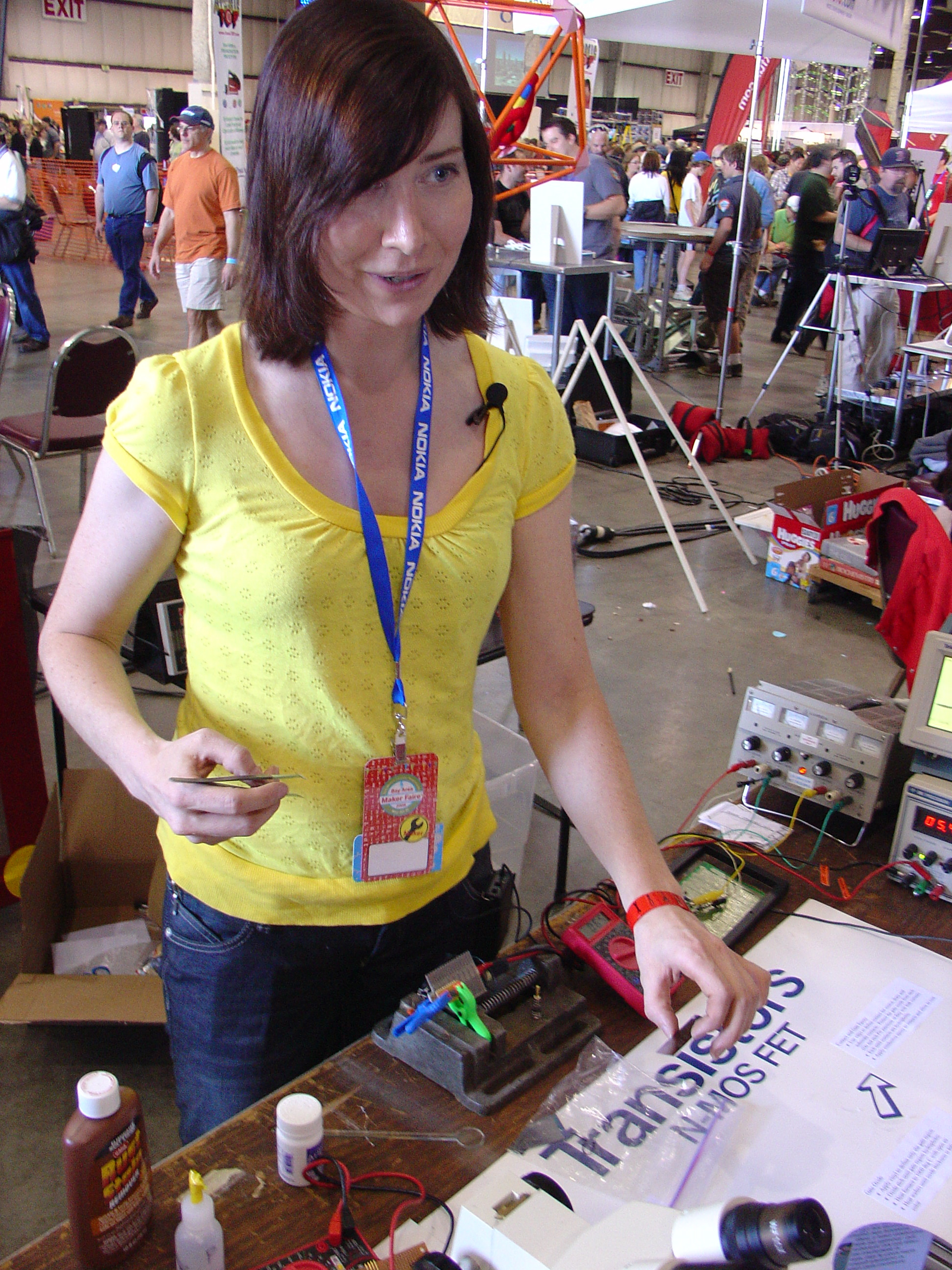
Autodidact computer chip designer and inventor, Jeri Ellsworth, at the Bay Area "Maker Faire" in 2009.

Another possible reason for lower female participation in engineering fields is the prevalence of values associated with the male gender role in workplace culture. For example, some women in engineering have found it difficult to re-enter the workforce after a period of absence. Because men are less likely to take time off to raise a family, this disproportionately affects women.

Men are also associated with taking leadership roles in the workplace. By holding a position of power over women, they may create an uncomfortable environment for them. For example, women may receive lower pay, more responsibilities, or less appreciation as compared to men. However, women may have more potential to become good leaders: studies have indicated that women have more key leadership skills; for example, the ability to motivate employees, build relationships, and take initiative.

Communication is also a contributing factor to the divide between men and women in the workplace. Male-to-male communication is said to be more direct, but when men explain a task to a woman, they tend to talk down, or “dumb down” terms. This comes from the stereotype that men are more qualified than women, and can cause men to treat women as inferiors instead of equals. Other typically masculine traits, such as workplace sexual harassment and creating a hostile work environment also certainly contribute to this atmosphere of domineering attitudes towards women.

Part of the male dominance in the engineering field is explained by their perception towards engineering itself. A study in 1964 found that both women and men believed that engineering was masculine in nature.

Over the past several decades, women's representation in the workforce in STEM fields, specifically engineering, has slowly improved. In 1960, women made up around 1% of all engineers, and by the year 2000, women made up 11% of all engineers, for an increase of 0.25 percentage points per year. At this rate, one would not expect 50-50 gender parity in engineering to occur until the year 2156.

Several colleges and universities nationwide are attempting to decrease the gender gap between men and women in the engineering field by recruiting more women into their programs. Their strategies include increasing women's exposure to STEM courses during high school, planting the idea of a positive outlook on female participation from the engineering culture, and producing a more female-friendly environment inside and outside the classroom. These strategies have helped institutions encourage more women to enroll in engineering programs as well as other STEM-based majors. For universities to encourage women to enroll in their graduate programs, institutions have to emphasize the importance of recruiting women, emphasize the importance of STEM education at the undergraduate level, offer financial aid, and develop more efficient methods for recruiting women to their programs.

== Statistics ==
Percentage of female undergraduate students with engineering degree in India, Australia, Canada, the UK, and US
Country	% of women	year
Australia	14%	2010
Canada	21.8%	2017
India	29.7%	2018
United Kingdom	17.57%	2016-2017
United States	19.7%	2015-2016

=== United States ===
In 2014, there were 7.9% female freshmen among all first-year students planning to study in STEM (science, technology, engineering, and mathematics) related majors. In comparison, 26.9% male freshmen intended to major in STEM. For female students who chose engineering, over 32% decided to switch to a different major.

Since 1997, the percentage of Asian females enrolling in engineering majors has risen from about 30% to 34% but somehow also dropped in 2002. African American females have increased their representation in engineering from 21% to 33% in the same time frame. Mexican American and Puerto Rican females have had an increase in their representation from 25% to 31%. Even if ethnicities are included in these statistics, men from all ethnicities still outnumber the proportion of women who enroll in engineering bachelor programs.

The percentage of master's degrees awarded to women has not changed much from 2003 (22.3%) to 2012 (23.1%). The percentage of doctoral degrees awarded to women in engineering increased from 11.6% in 1995, to 17.4% in 2004, to 21.1% in 2008, then to 22.2% in 2012.

There is a significant drop-off rate regarding the number of women who earn a bachelor's degree and the women who afterward enroll in graduate school. Over the last 35 years, women have been more likely than men to enroll in graduate school right after receiving their bachelor's degree. Women who do not enroll in a graduate program right after earning their bachelor's degree tend to be caregivers who face work-family conflicts in the context of family women. The workforce remains the area of lowest representation for women. There were 13% female engineers in 2016. Usually, the salary of female engineers is 10% less than male engineers. The retention of female engineers is also disproportionally low; in 2006, 62.6% of qualified male engineers were employed in engineering professions, as opposed to 47.1% of qualified female engineers.

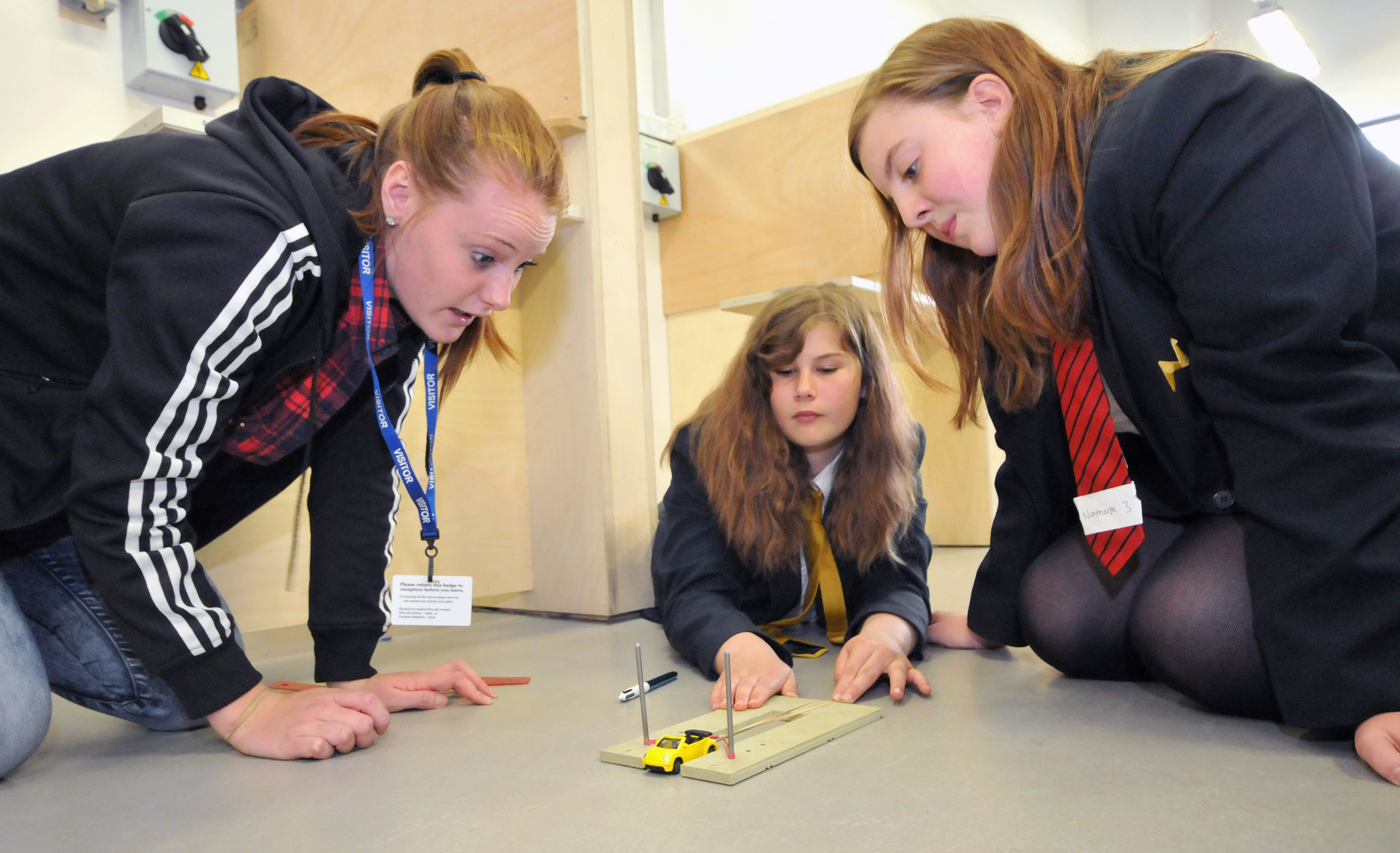
Female engineering students in class

=== Canada ===
Though women tend to make up more than half of the undergraduate population in Canada, the number of women in engineering is disproportionately low. In 2017, 21.8% of undergraduate engineering students were women, and 20.6% of undergraduate engineering degrees were awarded to women. The enrollment of women in engineering climbed from 16% in 1991 to over 20% in 2001, but by 2009 this number had fallen to 17%. One commentator attributed this drop to a number of factors, such as the failure of higher education programs to explain how engineering can improve others' lives, a lack of awareness of what engineers do, lack of networking opportunities and discomfort of being in a male-dominated environment and the perception that women must adapt to fit in.

In the 1990s, undergraduate enrollment of women in engineering fluctuated from 17% to 18%, while in 2001, it rose to 20.6%. In 2010, 17.7% of students in undergraduate engineering were women.

2016 percentage of women enrolled in tertiary education programs in Canada
Province	Undergraduate	Graduate	Doctoral
Alberta	22%	23.3%	23.3%
British Columbia	16.5%	27.5%	27.5%
Manitoba	16%	22.9%	22.9%
New Brunswick	15.9%	19.3%	19.3%
Newfoundland and Labrador	20.9%	20.6%	20.6%
Northwest Territories	—	—	—
Nova Scotia	18.7%	15.8%	15.8%
Nunavut	—	—	—
Ontario	17.7%	21.4%	21.4%
Prince Edward Island	—	—	—
Quebec	16.3%	20.4%	20.4%
Saskatchewan	19%	27.9%	27.9%
Yukon Territory	—	—	—
Canada	17.7%	21.9%	21.9%

In 2017, the disciplines with the highest proportion of undergraduates who are women were environmental, biosystems, and geological engineering. Four out of the five disciplines with the largest percentages of undergraduate who are women were also the disciplines with the fewest overall undergraduate students enrolled. The lowest proportion of women were found in mechanical (14.2%), software (14.6%), and computer engineering (14.8%).

The number of women enrolled in undergraduate, graduate, and doctoral engineering programs tends to vary by province, with the proportion in Newfoundland and Labrador, Prince Edward Island, and Alberta.

The percentage of engineering faculty who are women increased from 13.4% in 2013 to 15.5% in 2017. The University of Toronto has the highest number of female professors in Canada (21) and École Polytechnique de Montréal (18), University of Waterloo (17) and the University of British Columbia (16).

CCWE1992 goals for 1997 and actual 2009 percentage of women involved in engineering in Canada
Women in...	1997	2009
1st year undergraduate	25-25%	
Undergraduate programs		17.4%
Master's studies	20%	24.1%
Doctoral studies	10%	22%
Faculty members: professors	5%	Full: 7% Associate: 11% Assistant: 18%
Eng. degree graduates	18%	17.6%
Profession		10.4%

In 2011, the INWES (International Network of Women Engineers and Scientists) Education and Research Institute (ERI) held a national workshop, Canadian Committee of Women in Engineering (CCWE+20), to determine ways of increasing the number of women in the engineering field in Canada. CCWE+20 identified a goal of increasing women's interest in engineering by 2.6% by 2016 to a total of 25% through more incentives such as through collaboration and special projects. The workshop identifies early education as one of the main barriers in addition to other factors, such as: "the popular culture of their generation, the guidance they receive on course selection in high school and the extent to which their parents, teachers, and counsellors recognize engineering as an appropriate and legitimate career choice for women." The workshop report compares enrollment, teaching, and professional statistics from the goals identified in 1997 compared to the actual data from 2009, outlining areas of improvement (see table, right).

Smith Engineering at Queen's University has a Chair for Women in Engineering, Heidi Ploeg.

=== United Kingdom ===
According to the Women's Engineering Society's statistics document, 12.37% of engineers in the UK are female in 2018. 25.4% of females from 16 to 18 years old plan to have a career in the engineering field, compared to 51.9% of males from the same age group.

The Royal Academy of Engineering reported in 2020 that the gender pay gap in the engineering profession is smaller than the average for all UK employment. The mean (10.8%) and median (11.4%) pay gap for engineers in the sample analysed is around two thirds the national average. In 2017, the average salary for female engineers across all engineering fields was £38,109, whereas the average salary for male engineers across all fields was £48,866. The industry average salary is £48,000

== Portrayal in popular culture ==
The 2016 Hollywood film Hidden Figures follows three African American women engineers' work at NASA in 1960. The film was nominated for the 89th Academy Award for Best Picture. In 2019, Mary Robinette Kowal published SF novel The Calculating Stars, which also tells the story of women engineers working in NASA around the same period. The novel received Nebula Award for Best Novel and Hugo Award for Best Novel.

== See also ==
- Diversity in computing
- Ecole Polytechnique massacre in Montreal, where women were targeted by a mass murderer because they were female engineering students
- History of women in engineering
- African women in engineering
- History of women in engineering in the United Kingdom
- List of prizes, medals, and awards for women in engineering
- Matilda effect
- Occupational sexism
- Society of Women Engineers
- STEM pipeline
- Structural inequality in education
- Women in computing
- Women's Engineering Society
- Women in engineering in the United States
- Women in science
- Women in STEM fields
- Women in the workforce
