= P. K. Thressia =

Civil engineer

- Born: March 12, 1924; Kerala
- Died: November 18, 1981 (aged 57)
- Known for: India's first female chief engineer

P.K. Thressia (12 March 1924 - 18 November 1981) was a civil engineer, who became India's first female chief engineer.

== Early life and education ==
P.K. Thressia was born in Kerala on the 12 March 1924 into a devout Syrian Catholic family. She was the second of six children of Kunchalichy and Kakkappan Thressia. Her father worked as an agriculturist.

She attended the St Mary's High School in Kattoor and through her father's encouragement went onto study Civil Engineering at the College of Engineering, Guindy (CEG), alongside fellow women engineers, Ayyalasomayajula Lalitha and Leelamma Koshie. She graduated in 1944, after her degree was compressed to three and half years due to the Second World War.

== Engineering career ==
After graduating, Thressia worked as a Section Officer for the Public Works Commission of the Kingdom of Cochin, (in modern day Kerala) which was under the British rule. She soon received a promotion to the Assistant Construction Engineer for the TB Sanatorium, Mulakunnathukavu. She became Executive Engineer in 1956, which meant she had to move to Ernakulam, where she worked for nine years. In 1966, she was promoted to Superintending Engineer of Kozhikode Roads and Buildings.

In 1971, she was promoted to Chief Engineer of the state of Kerala. In this role she worked on significant road construction projects, pioneered the use of rubberised bitumen for road surfaces and commissioned up to 35 new bridges a year. Thressia also worked on infrastructure projects including the construction of hospitals. In Roots and Wings, by Shantha Mohan, she is quoted as saying that 'an engineer's life is not as difficult as many women think.'

P.K. Thressia retired in 1979, after working for the Kerala Public Works Department for 34 years and became a founding consultant for the firm Taj Engineers.
