= Martha Schneider-Bürger =

German engineer (1903–2001)

- Born: Martha Bürger; October 21, 1903; Sterkrade (Oberhausen)
- Died: September 25, 2001 (aged 97)
- Occupation: engineer author

Martha Schneider-Bürger (21 October 1903 in Sterkrade (Oberhausen) – 25 September 2001 in Gelnhausen) was a German civil engineer.

== Early life and education ==
Martha Schneider-Bürger was the eldest of four daughters born to engineer Hugo Bürger.

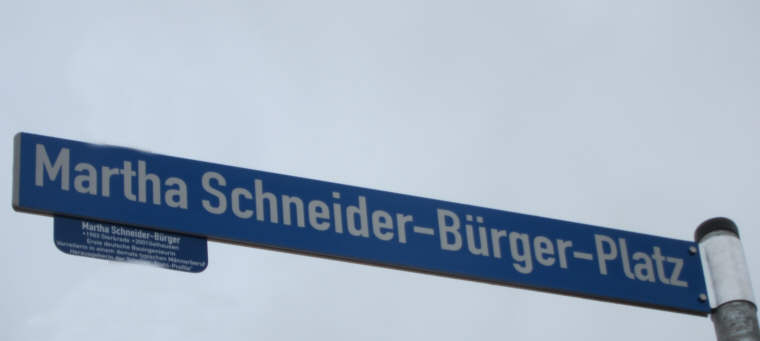
Martha Schneider-Bürger-Square in Oberhausen-Sterkrade

After graduating from high school in 1923, Martha Schneider-Bürger began studying structural engineering at the Technische Hochschule Karlsruhe (now Karlsruhe Institute of Technology) and after her intermediate diploma in 1925 she transferred to the Technische Hochschule Munich, a predecessor of Technical University of Munich, where she was the first German female civil engineer to graduate in 1927.

== Career ==
Martha Schneider-Bürger began her professional career in a Düsseldorf engineering office before joining the Wirtschaftsvereinigung Stahl - Beratungsstelle für Stahlverwendung (an association giving advice on the deployment of steel) in 1929 for ten years. She married Max Schneider and after the birth of two children she continued to work for this association as a freelancer.

In 1930, Martha Schneider-Bürger joined the Association of German Engineers. She was a member of various committees, including the group Women in the Engineering Profession. Furthermore, she supported the German Institute for Standardisation and contributed to the standardisation of steel construction issues.

Martha Schneider-Bürger is known primarily through her tables of steel sections which were used for decades and were published in 23 editions.

== Commemoration ==
In 2011 a square in Oberhausen-Sterkrade was named after her.

== Publication ==
- Martha Schneider-Bürger: Stahlbau-Profile. 23. edition, Verlag Stahleisen, Düsseldorf 2001, ISBN 3-514-00669-5
