= Hélène Mallebrancke =

Belgian civil engineer

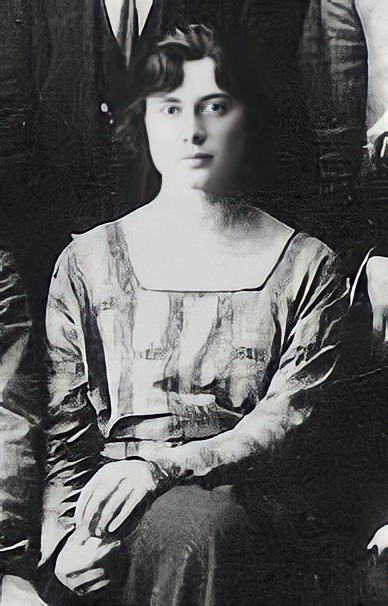
- Born: 3 March 1902; Molenbeek-Saint-Jean, Belgium
- Died: 30 August 1940 (aged 38); Ghent, Belgium
- Occupation: Engineer

Hélène Mallebrancke (3 March 1902 – 30 August 1940) was the first female Belgian civil engineer to graduate from the University of Ghent, and one of the earliest women engineers in Belgium. She was involved in the Belgian Resistance during the Second World War, keeping the Allied telecommunications networks in the Ghent region operational against huge odds. She was decorated posthumously by both the French government and the Belgian authorities.

== Early life ==
Hélène Mallebrancke was born on 3 March 1902 at Molenbeek-Saint-Jean, to Georges Mallebrancke, an engineer and Caroline Spijers

After studying at the lycée for young girls in Ghent, she passed the state exams, le Jury centrale in 1919. She then entered the State University of Ghent, where she graduated in 1924 as a civil engineer. Her father, Georges Mallebrancke, died on 27 November 1924. The following year she earned a diploma as electrical engineer with distinction.

== Career ==
In 1926, she joined the Belgian public telephone service, known from 1930 as the Régie des Télégraphes et Téléphones. By May 1940, she had become the chief engineer and was in charge of the Ghent region.

== World War Two ==
During the invasion of Belgium, although knowing that she had been seriously ill since the beginning of the year, she continued to work day and night in order to keep telecommunications operational in the Ghent region in support of the Allies of World War II.

Exhausted, she was admitted to the Marie-Médiatrice Institute in Ghent, where she died on 30 August 1940 at the age of thirty-eight.

When he learned of her death, Charles Huntziger, then Minister of War in the Government of Vichy France sent her mother the Croix de Guerre with palms and the citation based on that of the French Army:

Mademoiselle Hélène Mallebrancke, Ingénieur en Chef de la Régie Belge des Télégraphes et Téléphones, Ingénieur en chef de la Circonscription de Gand, a pris une part prépondérante aux travaux d'établissement des liaisons de commandement des Armées Alliées manœuvrant en Belgique; a su maintenir ou ramener à son poste le personnel de sa circonscription et a sauvegardé jusqu'au bout le fonctionnement du très important nœud de télécommunications de Gand; a donné à ses Collègues et à ses subordonnés un remarquable exemple de conscience professionnelle et de sang-froid. (Transl. "Miss Hélène Mallebrancke, Chief Engineer of the Belgian Telegraph and Telephone Authority, Chief Engineer of the District of Ghent, took a leading role in the work of establishing command links for the Allied Armies maneuvering in Belgium; has been able to maintain or bring back to her post the staff of her district and has safeguarded until the end the operation of the very important telecommunications node of Ghent; gave her colleagues and subordinates a remarkable example of professional conscience and composure.")

In November 1946, by decree of the Regent, Charles de Belgique, she received the Belgian Croix de guerre with palms.

== Awards and recognition ==
- French Croix de guerre (with palms).
- Belgian Croix de guerre (with palms)
- Chevalier de l'Ordre de Léopold (Knight of the Order of Leopold)
- In 2020, a road was named in her honour at Oostakker, la Mallebranckestraat

== See also ==
- Marguerite Massart, the first Belgian woman to qualify as an engineer in Belgium, in 1922.
- Marie-Louise Compernolle was the first Flemish woman to earn a PhD in engineering, from Ghent University in 1932.
