= Tracy Camp =

American computer scientist

Tracy Kay Camp
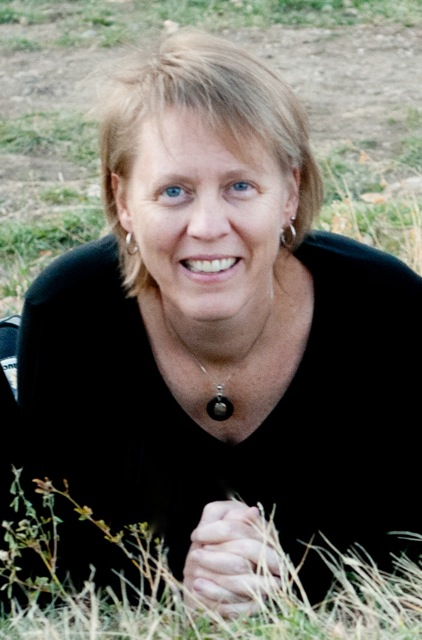
- Tracy Camp
- Born: September 27, 1964 (age 61); Detroit, Michigan, U.S.
- Education: The College of William and Mary; Michigan State University; Kalamazoo College
- Awards: ACM Fellow, IEEE Fellow
- Scientific career
- Fields: Computer science
- Workplaces: Colorado School of Mines; University of Alabama; Computing Research Association
- Doctoral advisor: Phil Kearns

Tracy Kay Camp (born September 27, 1964) is an American computer scientist noted for her research on wireless networking. She is also noted for her leadership in broadening participation in computing. She was the co-chair of CRA-W from 2011 to 2014 and she was the co-chair of ACM-W from 1998 to 2002. On July 1, 2022, she became the Executive Director of the Computing Research Association.

== Biography ==
Camp received a B.A. in Mathematics from Kalamazoo College in 1987. She received a M.S. in Computer Science from Michigan State University in 1989 and a Ph.D in Computer Science from The College of William & Mary in 1993.

She then joined the Department of Computer Science at the University of Alabama as an assistant professor in 1993. In 1998 she moved to the Colorado School of Mines as an assistant professor, and was then promoted to associate professor in 2000 and to professor in 2007. In 2010–11, she was interim head of Mathematical and Computer Sciences. She became the founding head of the Department of Computer Science at Colorado School of Mines in 2016 and served in that role until she joined the Computing Research Association in 2022.

== Awards ==
In 2012, she was named an ACM Fellow. She became an IEEE Fellow in 2016. In 2021, she received the SIGCSE Test of Time Award that recognizes an outstanding paper published in the SIGCSE community that has had meaningful impact on computing education practice and research. This award was for her paper published in 1997 entitled "The Incredible Shrinking Pipeline", published in Communications of the ACM.
