= Hattie Scott Peterson =

African-American engineer

- Born: Hattie T. Scott; October 11, 1913; Norfolk, Virginia, US
- Died: 10 April 1993 (aged 79); Sacramento, California, US
- Education: Howard University
- Known for: First African-American woman to gain degree in civil engineering; First woman engineer in her local USACE
- Children: Lori Peterson (Adopted)
- Scientific career
- Fields: Civil engineering
- Workplaces: U.S. Geological Survey; U.S. Army Corps of Engineers

Hattie T. Scott Peterson (1913–1993) is believed to be the first African-American woman to gain a bachelor's degree in civil engineering.

== Biography ==
Hattie Scott was born in Norfolk, Virginia, on October 11, 1913. Her parents were Hattie (Williams), a waitress and servant, and Uzeil Scott, a local mill foreman. Her parents had seemingly secured financial stability since they owned the house they lived in. Hattie was married to William Bright Jr. for 6 years from 1934 to 1940, when they divorced. She worked in the U.S. Government Accounting Office helping to audit government contracts during World War II. After beginning classes at Howard University, she met Donald Charles Peterson, whom she married in 1943.

Hattie attended Abraham Lincoln School as well as Booker T. Washington High School in Norfolk. After working for the Government Accounting Office for a while, she enrolled at Howard University. In 1946, Peterson graduated from Howard University with a Bachelor of Science in Civil Engineering, in doing so, she became the first African American woman to graduate with a civil engineering degree in the United States. Hattie mentioned that if she was unable to find work, she would further her education. However, after moving to Sacramento, California in 1947, Peterson began working as a survey and cartographic engineer for the U.S. Geological Survey (USGS).

Peterson joined the local U.S. Army Corps of Engineers (USACE) in 1954, making her the first female engineer to work for USACE. Peterson's work was focused on flood risk reduction, but she also advocated for engineering as a profession for women and women's rights as a whole.

Peterson was a member of the National Technical Association, the American Society for Photogrammetry and Remote Sensing (ASPRS), and the Unitarian Church. She was also a member of the Alpha Kappa Alpha sorority. She died on April 10, 1993, in Sacramento. Upon her death, Mrs. Peterson left an endowment for scholarships to help future engineers at Howard University.

== Honor ==
In addition to the scholarships in her honor, the Sacramento district of the USACE grants a Hattie Peterson Inspirational Award annually in her honor: "The purpose of the Hattie Peterson Award is to recognize the Sacramento District individual whose actions best exemplify the highest qualities of personal and professional perseverance through social challenges."
