= Leelamma Koshie =

Indian woman engineer (1923–1989)

Leelamma Koshie (30 March 1923 - 1989, née Leelamma George) was a pioneering female Indian civil engineer. She was one of the group of three women who were the first women engineers in India, with Ayyalasomayajula Lalitha and P. K. Thressia. They qualified at College of Engineering, Guindy (CEG) in 1944.

== Early life and education ==
Leelamma George was born on 30 March 1923 to Saint Thomas Christians parents A. K. George and Annama George, in Kerala. Her father had been educated in England. She started school in Trivandrum at the aged of six and graduated from high school after only six years; she gained high distinction in her intermediate examinations, the level before university, at the age of 14. Her father was eager for her to study medicine, and she enrolled at the Christian Medical College, Ludhiana, a five-day train journey away. She completed one year of studies but left during the second year because she had an aversion to the dissection necessary for the anatomy course. After a brief spell at the Lady Hardinge Medical College she discontinued medical studies and entered College of Engineering, Guindy (CEG) in Chennai at the age of 16.

At CEG she was one of the first three female students along with Ayyalasomayajula Lalitha, with whom she shared accommodation, and P. K. Thressia, whose family home was in Chennai. Kochie and Lalitha wrote an essay "Eves in Engineering" in 1941, which was republished in the college's bicentenary volume Survey School to Tech Temple, 1794-1994. They urged the provision of female accommodation on campus, and encouraged other women:

"May we appeal to all our sisters to follow the lead which has been our luck and fortune to have taken on ourselves ... Can half the population of the world afford to be ignorant of a science and profession responsible for the creation and maintenance of the present-day civilisation?"

She graduated from CEG aged 19, with a degree with distinction, one of the top three students of the university.

== Career ==
After she graduated, she worked in the Travancore public works department (PWD) as a junior engineer. The maharani of Travancore, Sethu Parvathi Bayi, sponsored Koshie to travel to England to continue her education, promising her promotion on her return, and she studied town planning. She was reluctant to travel to England as her father was unwell, but he persuaded to go. He died in 1945, during her absence. After studying in England she travelled in Eastern Europe before returning to India in 1947, where the struggle for independence meant that the promised promotion did not materialise.

Koshie spent the rest of her career in the Travancore PWD, involved in many projects including housing developments. When she retired in 1978 she was the Deputy Chief Engineer.

She is recognised as one of India's pioneering women engineers.

== Personal life ==
Leelamma George married Thomas Koshie in 1949. He had never left Kerala and worked in the Accountant General's office, so their experiences had been very different, but he shared her Saint Thomas Christian faith. They had three sons who all entered engineering professions: mechanical engineering, metallurgy and software.

She retired in 1978 and soon afterwards was diagnosed with breast cancer, but after treatment lived another 11 years. She was involved in her church's planning of an extension, read the whole Bible twice in her retirement, founded a Christian women's group called Christujyothi, and assisted with slum improvement programmes in the Chenkachoola slum area of Trivandrum. She died in 1989.
