= Laurel van der Wal =

American aeronautical engineer (1924–2009)

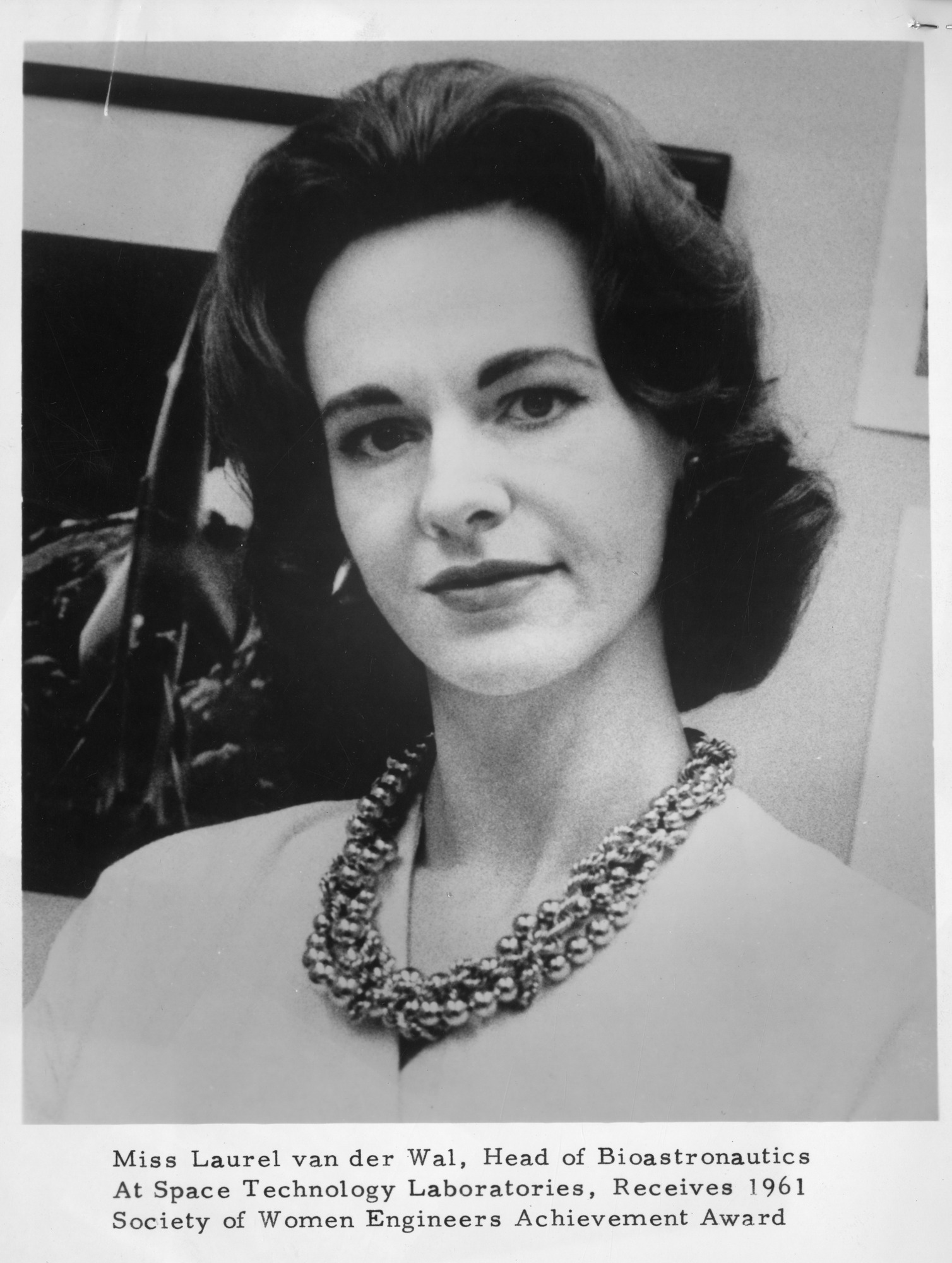
- Laurel van der Wal, Smithsonian Institution Archives.
- Born: Laurel Van der Wal, September 22, 1924; San Francisco, California
- Died: August 13, 2009 (aged 84); Santa Monica, California
- Other name: Laurel Roennau
- Education: University of California Berkeley - 1949 BS Mechanical Engineering, and graduate course work
- Occupations: Bioastronautics research and development
- Known for: Bioastronautics research, physiological effects of space flight on mice / human space flight research
- Spouse: William Henry Roennau (divorced)
- Engineering career
- Discipline: Aeronautical engineering, Mechanical engineering
- Institutions: Los Angeles Board of Airport Commissioners, Southern California Association of Governments
- Employers: Douglas Aircraft, Reaction Motors Inc, Rheem Manufacturing Company, Ramo-Wooldridge (TRW)
- Projects: Project MIA - Mouse-in-Able
- Awards: 1961 Achievement Award Society of Women Engineers

Laurel van der Wal (September 22, 1924 – August 13, 2009) was an American mechanical and aeronautical engineer and paved the way for crewed space flight. She is known for contributions to bioastronautics, specifically researching biological and medical aspects of human space flight.

She developed and led Project MIA (Mouse-in-Able), which sent two mice into space in the nose cones of Thor-Able rockets and studied the psychological effects of U.S. space flight using mice as the test subjects. She also focused on the design of crewed spacecraft as well as escape and recovery systems for astronauts.

She was awarded the 1961 Society of Women Engineers highest award, the Achievement Award, for contributions to bioengineering and bioastronautics. When asked if she would want to go into space herself, she answered, "I'd go in a minute, if they'd let me."

== Early life and education ==
Van der Wal was born in San Francisco, the daughter of Lillian and Richard van der Wal, both from Spokane, Washington. Her mother was a former teacher and an alumna of the University of Washington; her father was a businessman. She graduated from high school at age 15, and worked as a model, an art instructor, a deputy sheriff, a showgirl, a railroad switch tower operator, and a casino shill as a young woman.

"I am impatient with people who do not make full use of all their capabilities," she explained in 1962.

She admired pilots and hoped to earn a pilot license, but instead worked as an aircraft mechanic during World War II, at Hamilton Air Force Base.

Van der Wal studied mechanical engineering at the University of California Berkeley, where she earned a Bachelor of Science degree in 1949, with honors (Tau Beta Pi Woman's Badge, Sigma Xi).

=== Postgraduate work, scholarships and fellowships ===
Her graduate education at the University of California, Berkeley, UCLA, and the Royal Institute of Technology in Stockholm, Sweden. to study aeronautics was funded in part by a National Research Council fellowship. As part of her fellowship, she attended the Eight International Congress of Theoretical and Applied Mechanics (Istanbul, Turkey) and the Third Congress of the International Astronautical Federation (Stuttgart, Germany). Other Scholarships and fellowships included:

- 1947 Howard Holmes Scholarship, University of California
- 1948 Douglas Aircraft Scholarship, University of California
- 1947-1949 Reader, Descriptive Geometry, Engineering Design Division, University of California.
- 1949-1950 Reader, Nomography, Engineering Design Division, University of California
- 1949 - 1950 Teaching Assistant, Senior Laboratory Course, Mechanical Engineering Division, University of California.
- 1951 - 1953 National Research Council (NACA) Fellowship in Aeronautics, Royal Institute of Technology Stockholm, Sweden.

== Career ==
In 1944, Van der Wal began her technical career as an aircraft engine mechanic with the U.S. Army Air Forces at Hamilton Field Air Force Base, California. As a young engineer van der Wal worked at Douglas Aircraft as a data analyst on the Nike missile program and later designing missile systems for the Ramo-Wooldridge Corporation. Starting in 1958, she was the project engineer on three MIA (Mouse-in-Able) launches from Cape Canaveral, as head of bioastronautics at Space Technology Laboratories. She was named the Los Angeles Times's "1960 Woman of the Year in Science" for her work.

=== Research and development ===
During her university career (1947–1949) Van der Wal worked on an aerodynamic heating project that evaluated wind tunnel operation, model design and construction and theoretical analysis. She then tackled a Los Pressures Project which examined low-density subsonic and supersonic tunnels.

In 1950, Van der Wal joined Douglas Aircraft Company, Inc. as a laboratory research analyst, working on Servomechanism in the Guided Missiles Division. She was involved in control system design and participated in firing program activities at White Sands Proving Ground, New Mexico for the NIKE program.

In 1953, Van der Wal moved to New Jersey and began work at Reaction Motors Inc. of Rockaway, New Jersey in the Turbopump Group, Development Section. During her time with Reaction Motors, she worked on theoretical investigations of the starting time of self-sustaining turbopump rocket systems, evaluation of fuel-tank pressurization systems, determination of test area liquid oxygen losses and boil-off loss reduction possibilities.

Later in 1953, Van der Wal joined the Rheem Manufacturing Company, Government Products Division, Research and Development Laboratories in Downey, California as a Design Engineer. She was focused on general performance analysis, subsonic and supersonic drones and aerodynamics. She began working on tool design, proposals, design and testing of fuse components for fast-burning rockets before moving to the aircraft engineering department as an aerodynamicist. Here she was involved in analyzing all phases of aerodynamics as applied to the design, performance and operation of aircraft, missiles and drones.

=== Bioastronautics, Mouse-In-Able and crewed space flight ===
In 1956 Van der Wal joined Ramo-Wooldridge where she was involved in the preliminary design of advanced missile and space-probe systems. In 1958, Ramo-Wooldridge changed its name to Space Technologies Laboratories Inc (later becoming Thompson-Ramo-Wooldridge or TRW). Van der Wal conducted research into bioastronautics and the effects of space on mammals and Zero-G experiments.

Van der Wal was the head of the bioastronautics at Space Technologies Laboratories (later TRW). She was instrumental in the drive to launch humans into space and successfully bring them home. Her research into the engineering problems of crewed space flight included a revolutionary experiment called Project Mice-In-Able (or MIA). Project MIA placed white mice in the nose cones of Thor-Able rockets to measure their heartbeats. This data was telemetered to Earth and provided data on the physiological effects of space flight. Benji and Laska traveled in a “Mouse House” that cradled the mouse and held food, water, and dehumidifying chemicals. Another cylinder contained air puritans and a blower system circulated air through the Mouse House. The total weight of all the MIA equipment was ten pounds.

Although the nose cones were not located by recovery ships, telemetry proved that the mice had normal heart rates while traveling at speeds exceeding 15,000 miles per hour, reached a record altitude of 14,000 statute miles, and withstood decelerations well over 60 g's and nose cone skin temperatures of several hundred degrees Fahrenheit. Both mice survived re-entry. Her work paved the way for crewed space flight in 1961.

=== Consulting ===
In 1961, Van der Wal was appointed to the Los Angeles Board of Airport Commissioners and served as a commissioner until 1967.

In 1968, she served as Los Angeles International Airport's planner.

In the early 1970s, Van der Wal wrote several reports for the Rand Corporation about planning a more effective transportation system.

In 1974 she worked for the Southern California Association of Governments for twelve years and was a noted activist on behalf of slow growth in Santa Monica, California, serving as an advisor to the Santa Monica Coalition for a Liveable City

== Selected Published Works ==
- “Medical Engineering - Limbs of Tomorrow.” Engineer, University of California publication, April 1947; a review of prosthetic devices research at the University of California.
- “Optimum Components for Long Range Rockers.” co-authored with Dr. S. Cornog. Presented at the Third Congress of the International Astronautical Federation, Stuttgart, Germany, 1952
- “Investigation of Uninsulated Test Stand Liquid Oxygen Propellant Tank Boil-Off Losses and Boil-Off Loss Reduction Possibilities by the Application of Insulation.” co-authored with H.M. Brown, W. H. Emrick. Reaction Motors, Inc., Rockaway, New Jersey, 1953.
- “Sanitation in Space.” Copyright as part of the April 1960 Journal Water Pollution Control Federation, Washington 16, DC May 1959
- “Project MIA (Mouse-in-Able), Experiments on Physiological Response to Spaceflight.” co-authored with W. D. Young. ARS Journal, October 1959.
- “On Target for Tomorrow - The Explorer Scout Space Science Exposition.” co-authored with Dr. V. S. Haneman. Astronautics, July 1960
- “Package Experiment for Bioastronautics Research.” Vol III of the Proceedings of the 4th Symposium on Ballistic Missiles and Space Technology held at the University of California at Los Angeles, August 34–37, 1959

== Awards, honors and professional affiliations ==
Van der Val was an active member of the American Rocket Society. She was on several committees: ad hoc member of the Space Flight Committee (1952–1953), member of the National Committee on Education (1958-?) and the National Committee on Human Factors and Bioastronautics (1958-?). Van der Wal was also a Board Director of the Southern California chapter of the American Rocket Society (1959–1960), where she took particular interest in partnering with Explorer Scouts to teach children about space and aeronautics. "Kids all over the world are excited about space," she explained in 1960, "because this is the challenge to their generation". As the space program gained popularity in the 1960s, she was a popular speaker at women's clubs, teachers' meetings and other events. In 1968, she explained that the children she taught "... are the most important thing ever to happen to me, ever."

Van der Val was also a member of the American Astronautical Society, British Interplanetary Society, Institute of Aeronautical Sciences, and Aerospace Medical Association.

Van der Val received the:

- 1961 Society of Women Engineers Achievement Award in "recognition of her significant contributions to the developing field of space biology.
- 1960 Los Angeles Times “Woman Scientist of the Year”
- 1961 Aerospace Medical Association Wives' Wing of the Aerospace "outstanding women scientist."

== Legacy ==
Van der Wal's pioneering work with mice in rocket nose cones paved the way for human space flight. She originated the Project MIA study of the physiological effects of space flight on mice in U.S. rockets. She also worked on escape and recovery systems and the design of human spaceflight.

Van der Wal was the first woman appointed to the Los Angeles Board of Airport Commissioners, in 1961, and served as a commissioner until 1967. In 1968, she served as Los Angeles International Airport's planner.

== Personal life ==
Laurel van der Wal married fellow engineer William Henry Roennau in 1961, in Arlington, Virginia. The Roennaus had two sons, Jonathan and Michael. Laurel and William later divorced. She retired in the late 1980s, and died in August 2009, in Santa Monica.

== Additional Reading ==
Reed, Linda (2025). Chapter 13 "Laurel Van der Wal". In Craig, Cecilia; Teig, Holly; Kimberling, Debra; Williams, Janet; Tietjen, Jill; Johnson, Vicki (eds.). Women Engineering Legends 1952-1976: Society of Women Engineers Achievement Award Recipients. Springer Cham. ISBN 978-3-032-00223-5
