= Marie Louise Compernolle =

First woman Flemish chemical engineer

- Born: September 17, 1909; Assebroek
- Died: February 11, 2005 (aged 95)
- Education: University of Ghent
- Occupation: Engineer

Marie Louise Compernolle (1909–2005) was the first female Flemish chemical engineer.

== Early life ==
Marie Louise Compernolle was born on 17 September 1909 in Assebroek, Flanders in Belgium to Hector Compernolle (1879-1960) and Marguerite De Smet (1882-1949). She had a younger brother, Harry Compernolle (1913-1989) who later went on to become one of the two first paediatricians in Belgium. Hector owned a business which sold soil excavated in the deciduous forests around Bruges, which florists used for the cultivation of azaleas in Ghent. Marguerite ran a grocery store from their home.

Flavie De Smet, her mother Marguerite's eldest sister, was married to Jules Van den bussche, head teacher of the municipal school for boys in Assebroek, and the couple supported their niece and nephew's education.

== Education ==
Compernolle was taught first by nuns, then attended her uncle Jules's school in Assebroek, and was the only girl in the school. She then moved to the State Middle School in nearby Bruges, Until then, Compernolle had been educated in Flemish but the school taught lessons in French so she had to adjust to that. She moved on to the Royal Athenaeum after three years, where she was the first girl to be admitted. Having been a successful student, Compernolle passed the university entrance examinations to study engineering and began her studies at Ghent University in 1929. She came to specialise in chemical engineering and studied with teachers such as chemist René Goubau, engineer Gustave Magnel, and physicist Jules Verschaffelt. In 1932, she graduated with a PhD in chemical engineering from Ghent University, the first female PhD in engineering from Ghent. (Hélène Mallebrancke earned a civil engineering degree in 1923/24).

== Career ==
Compernolle then planned to follow an academic career. Her application for the post of assistant in experimental physics to Professor Moens was turned down, with the feedback that as the country was in a period of economic crisis, priority was to be given to male rather than female applicants. The following year, Compernolle succedded in being admitted, on a trial basis, as an assistant in Moens' laboratory. In October 1934, this post was converted into a full assistant role. However, two years later, the extension of the role, which should have been a mere formality, again encountered obstacles. Instead of renewing her contract, Compernolle was demoted to the title of assistant ad interim. In 1937, she resigned her post, having met so much opposition whilst her husband's career flourished.

== Personal life ==
Compernolle married Polydoor Mortier on 12 September 1936. He was a doctor of mathematics and physics and later a professor. The couple met working in Moens' Laboratory.

Compernolle finally chose to give up her career to support her husband in his. In 1937, the couple left for the United States where Mortier had received a six-month scholarship from the Belgian American Educational Foundation to study at Brown University, Rhode Island. On their return, Mortier resumed his role in Moens' laboratory, eventually inheriting his academic chair. In an interview with Karel de Clerck for the review 't Atheneetje, Compernolle later confided that she would have "loved to remain an assistant at the university" adding “I made sure that my scientific interests were parallel to my husband's academic career. I helped him the best I could in every way. I have never regretted it".

The couple had four daughters between 1939 and 1948, Hilde Margareta, Els Elvina, Margereta Nelly and Elvina Olga. A fifth daughter died at birth in 1951. The surviving daughters respectively graduated in mathematics, became a pediatrician, radiologist and dentist, as Compernolle was determined that they would have the educational opportunities she had and a professional career too.

Marie Louise Compernolle died on 11 February 2005 and was buried at the Begraafplaats Afsnee in Ghent.
