= Ayyalasomayajula Lalitha =

Indian electrical engineer

- A. Lalitha, photographed in 1964 in New York.
- Born: 27 August 1919
- Died: 1979 (aged 59–60)
- Occupation: Engineer

Ayyalasomayajula Lalitha MIEE (A Lalitha) (27 August 1919 – 12 October 1979) was India's first female engineer.

== Early life and education ==
Ayyalasomayajula Lalitha was born in a Telugu-speaking family in Madras (now Chennai) on 27 August 1919. She was married at 15 and in 1937, gave birth to her daughter Syamala. Her husband died four months later. Her father, Pappu Subba Rao, supported her wish to complete her secondary education and study engineering at the otherwise all-male College of Engineering, Guindy (CEG) where he was a professor. At CEG, Lalitha studied alongside other women engineers P.K. Thressia and Leelamma Koshie (née George). As per her daughter, Lalitha was supported in the college by the administration and other students. ″Contrary to what people might think, the students at amma’s college were extremely supportive. She was the only girl in a college with hundreds of boys but no one ever made her feel uncomfortable and we need to give credit to this. The authorities arranged for a separate hostel for her too. I used to live with my uncle while amma was completing college and she would visit me every weekend. Lalitha graduated in 1943 with a degree in electrical engineering - becoming India's first woman engineer. She completed her practical training with a one year apprenticeship in Jamalpur Railway Workshop, a major repair and overhaul facility.

== Engineering career ==
After graduation, Lalitha worked at Central Standards Organisation, Shimla and helped her father research smokeless ovens and the jelectromonium (an electrical musical instrument).

She spent a year of practical training in the electrical department of the East Indian Railways, before becoming a technical assistant in the Indian Government’s Office of the Electrical Commissioner. Following this, in 1948, Lalitha joined a British firm Associated Electrical Industries (AEI) in Calcutta and worked on the largest dam in India, Bhakra Nangal Dam, designing transmission lines, and substation layouts. She worked at AEI (later taken over by General Electric Company) for nearly thirty years before she retired in 1977.

In 1953 the Council of the Institution of Electrical Engineers (IEE) of London elected her to be an associate member, and promoted her to full member in 1966.

Lalitha was the only female engineer from India to have attended the First International Conference of Women Engineers and Scientist (ICWES) in New York in 1964.

Lalitha was elected as a member of the British Women's Engineering Society in 1965 and served as the Organising Committees' India representative for the Second International Conference of Women Engineers and Scientist (ICWES) held in Cambridge in July 1967 and ensured that five women from India were able to attend.

== Personal life ==
Lalitha did not remarry after her husband's death. She lived for most of her life with her sister-in-law who helped to bring up her daughter Syamala, who took degrees in science subjects and became a mathematics teacher.

In 1979, Lalitha died of a brain aneurysm, aged 60.

== Other sources ==
Roots and Wings, by Shantha Mohan. Covers Lalitha and many other early women in engineering in India.
