= Anna Boyksen =

Anna Helene Boyksen
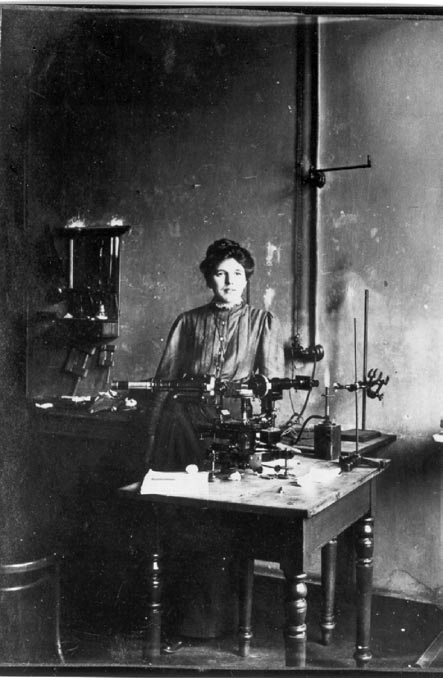
- Anna Boyksen in a laboratory at TH München
- Born: August 11, 1881; Havendorfersand, Grand Duchy of Oldenburg, German Empire
- Died: August 15, 1920 (aged 39)
- Other name: Anna Helene Koch
- Known for: First female engineering student at the Technical University of Munich

Anna Helene Koch (née Boyksen; 11 August 1881 – 15 August 1920) was the first female engineering student at the Technical University of Munich.

== Life ==
Anna Boyksen was born on 11 August 1881 in Havendorfersand, Grand Duchy of Oldenburg, to Dietrich Anton Boyksen, a merchant, and his wife Mathilde, née Lubben. In her curriculum vitae, Boyksen claimed her nationality as Bavarian and religion as evangelical. Her father died when she was 11 and she came under the care of a guardian, who ensured her financial wellbeing. Boyksen attended the girls’ grammar school in Karlsruhe, qualifying in 1904 with a university entrance qualification. She then studied mathematics and natural sciences at the University of Berlin for two years.

In April 1905 the Kingdom of Bavaria became the first German state to allow women to study at technical universities. A Reifezeugnis (school-leaving certificate) from a German Gymnasium or Realgymnasium was required for entry, which Boyksen held.

In 1906, she enrolled in the Institute of Electrical Engineering of the Technical University of Munich (TUM) and obtained the Vordiplom two years later, passing with the grade "Good".

In 1909 Boyksen married Wilhelm Koch and had a daughter. Her husband was a lawyer and studying at the University of Erlangen, and she moved there with her family and began studying economics and law. In 1911, she defended her dissertation, titled Die deutschen Börsenordnungen. Eine vergleichende Darstellung (The German Stock Exchange Regulations. A Comparative Representation), under her married name Anna Helene Koch.

Anna Boyksen died in 1920, aged only 39.

== Legacy ==
The Anna Boyksen Diversity Research Center at TUM "explores human diversity and the opportunities of diversity for society. Its work focuses on a question often overlooked in Germany: How can the natural, engineering and life sciences benefit from a more diverse community culture?".

The Anna Boyksen Fellowship has been offered by the TUM Institute for Advanced Study since 2014. The Fellowship is granted to outstanding international scholars and researchers who wish to probe gender / diversity-related problems in the Natural and Engineering Sciences, in collaboration with TUM researchers. The two-year Fellowship was created to help advance TUM's goal to become "Germany's most attractive university for women" and to foster a productive and durable exchange of ideas and solutions on an international level.

On 14 December 2025, the former Ludwig-Prandtl-Straße on the TUM Campus in Garching, Bavaria, was renamed Anna-Boyksen-Straße. It was part of a programme by TUM to rename places previously named after scientists with links to Nazism.
