= Justicia Acuña =

Chilean engineer

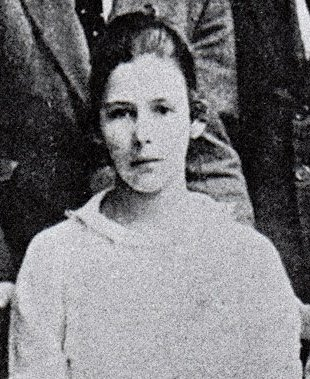
- Justicia Acuña in 1919
- Born: January 14, 1893; Santiago, Chile
- Died: August 16, 1980 (aged 87); Santiago, Chile
- Education: University of Chile
- Occupation: Civil engineer
- Known for: First woman civil engineer in Chile
- Children: 7
- Father: José Acuña Latorre

Justicia Espada Acuña Mena (January 14, 1893 – August 16, 1980) was a Chilean civil engineer. Justicia was the first woman to become a civil engineer in Chile.

== Biography ==
Justicia Acuña Mena was born in Santiago, Chile, on January 14, 1893. She was the daughter of an engineer, José Acuña Latorre. She had eight siblings. She studied at the Liceo de Aplicación and then at the Instituto Pedagógico. In 1913, she switched her studies from mathematics to civil engineering, and entered the Faculty of Physical and Mathematical Sciences of the University of Chile, being the only woman among all the students of that faculty. She graduated as a civil engineer in 1919, along with Jorge Alessandri.

In 1920, Acuña began working as a calculator in the Department of Roads and Works of the Empresa de los Ferrocarriles del Estado. During the course of her career at Empresa, she left a few times to raise her seven children, but always returned before retiring in 1954.

Acuña died in Santiago on 16 August 1980.

== Recognition ==
In July 1980, to honor Acuña's effort for the advancement of women, the Chilean College of Engineers established the "Gallery of Illustrious Engineers", where she was included.

In 1991, the Justicia Acuña Mena Award was created; it is awarded every two years to an outstanding woman engineer in the practice of her profession.

On January 14, 2021, there was a Google Doodle to celebrate her on her birthday.

== See also ==
- Elisa Bachofen—first Argentinian woman graduated as a civil engineer in 1918.
