= Evelyna Bloem Souto =

Brazilian civil engineer (1926–2017)

- Born: 1926; São Paulo
- Died: 11 August 2017 (aged 90–91); São Paulo
- Occupations: Civil engineer, academic

Evelyna Bloem Souto (1926 – 11 August 2017) was the only woman in the first class of the civil engineering course at the University of São Paulo in São Carlos, Brazil. She overcame considerable prejudice against women in engineering to build a successful academic career.

== Early life ==
Evelyna Bloem Souto was born in 1926, in São Paulo. Her interest in civil engineering emerged during her childhood. Her father, Theodoreto de Arruda Souto, was the first director of the Escola de Engenharia de São Carlos da Universidade de São Paulo (EESC) (School of Engineering at the University of São Paulo) between 1952 and 1967. When her father met with friends, the young Evelyna would listen with interest to their conversations about engineering.

== Education ==
Bloem Souto started her undergraduate studies at Escola Politécnica da Universidade de São Paulo. In 1957, her third year of college, she transferred her course to University of São Paulo at São Carlos.

Whilst studying through a scholarship in France, she was made to dress as a man, wear galoshes, pin back her hair and draw a beard and moustache on her face so that she would be allowed on the work site of a tunnel alongside 10 male students. She agreed to participate as she really wanted to inspect the project, expecting to work on tunnels back in Brazil.

== Career ==
After graduation, Bloem Souto pursued and achieved a PhD. During her academic career she took part in more than 60 conferences around the world and received scholarships to develop research in other universities, including Harvard.

During the creation of a Geology and Soil Mechanics department, which she played a significant role in developing, the chairman made her take on the role of librarian so that "nobody would know I was an engineer. But I managed to carve out my own space and it wasn't long before I became head of everything". She played tour guide to the department when the then President of the Republic of Brazil, Juscelino Kubitschek, and the then Governor of the State of São Paulo, Jânio Quadros visited.

Bloem Souto taught Geotechnics at EESC and became a professor in the department for the rest of her working life. She played an essential part in the School from its inception, development and long term management, contributing to the institution becoming a national reference in the field of engineering.

== Death ==
Evelyna Bloem Souto died on 11 August 2017. A mass was held in her memory on 17 August 2017 at the church of Nossa Senhora do Perpétuo Socorro (Our Lady of Perpetual Help) in São Paulo.
