= Alice Perry =

Irish engineer

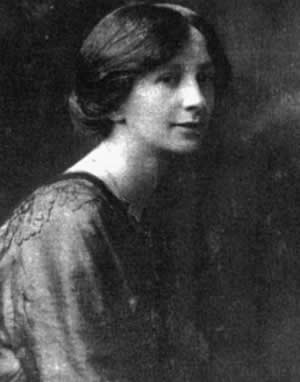
- Born: Alice Jacqueline Perry; 24 October 1885; Wellpark House, Galway, Ireland
- Died: 21 April 1969 (aged 83); Los Angeles
- Education: Royal University of Ireland, Galway
- Spouse: John Shaw
- Parent(s): James Perry and Martha Perry
- Engineering career
- Discipline: Civil

Alice Jacqueline Perry (24 October 1885 – 21 April 1969) was one of the first women in Europe to graduate with a degree in engineering.

== Early life and education ==
Born in Wellpark, Galway in 1885, Alice was one of five daughters and a son of Martha Park and James Perry. Her father was the county surveyor in Galway West and co-founded the Galway Electric Light Company. Her uncle, John Perry, was a Fellow of the Royal Society and invented the navigational gyroscope.

After graduating from the High School in Galway, she won a scholarship to study at Queen's College Galway in 1902. Having excelled in mathematics, she changed from studying for a degree in arts to an engineering degree. She graduated with first class honours in civil engineering in 1906. Alice was one of the first women in Europe to graduate with a degree in engineering - following Rita de Morais Sarmento (Civil Engineering and Public Works from the Academia Politécnica de Oporto (the Polytechnic Academy in Porto) in 1894) and Agnes Klingberg, Betzy Meyer, and Julie Arenholt, who graduated from 1897 to 1901, at the Polyteknisk Læreanstalt, today known as the Danmarks Tekniske Universitet.

The Perry family was academically gifted. Her sister Nettie studied modern languages and went on to become a lecturer in Spanish at London University. Sister Agnes Mary (known as Molly) earned BA (1903) and MA (1905) in mathematics from Queen's College Galway (later UCG then NUIG), taught there in 1903–1904, was a Royal University of Ireland examiner in mathematics in 1906, and later became assistant headmistress at a secondary school in London. She was described as "the most distinguished mathematician of her time in the college". Her sister Martha married the map scholar, Edward William O'Flaherty Lynam, and their son Joss Lynam also became an engineer. All of the Perry sisters were involved in the suffrage campaign in Galway.

== Career ==
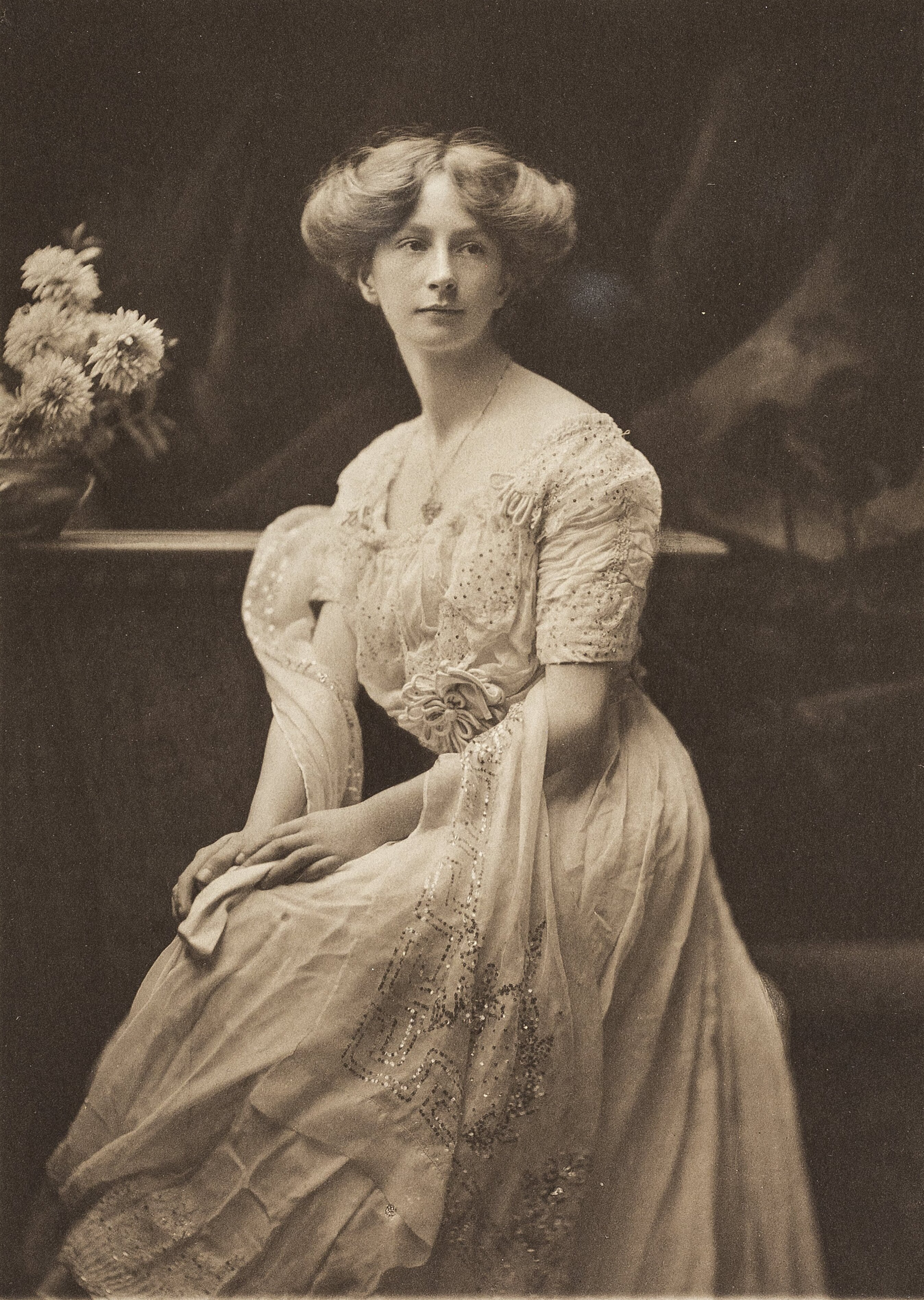
A 1908 portrait of Alice Jacqueline Perry

Following her 1906 graduation Alice was offered a senior postgraduate scholarship but owing to her father's death the following month, she did not take up this position. In December 1906 she succeeded her father temporarily as county surveyor for Galway County Council. She remained in this position for five or six months until a permanent appointment was made. She was an unsuccessful candidate for the permanent position and for a similar opportunity to be a surveyor in Galway East. She remains the only woman to have been a county surveyor (county engineer) in Ireland.

In 1908 she moved to London with her sisters, where she worked as a factory inspector for the Home Office. From there she moved to Glasgow, at which point she converted from Presbyterianism to Christian Science in 1915. She met and married John Shaw on 30 September 1916. Shaw was a soldier who died in 1917 on the Western Front.

== Later life and death ==
Perry retired from her inspector's position in 1921 and became interested in poetry, first publishing in 1922. In 1923 she moved to Boston, US, the headquarters of Christian Science. Until her death in 1969, Perry worked within the Christian Science movement as a poetry editor and practitioner, publishing seven books of poetry.

== Legacy ==
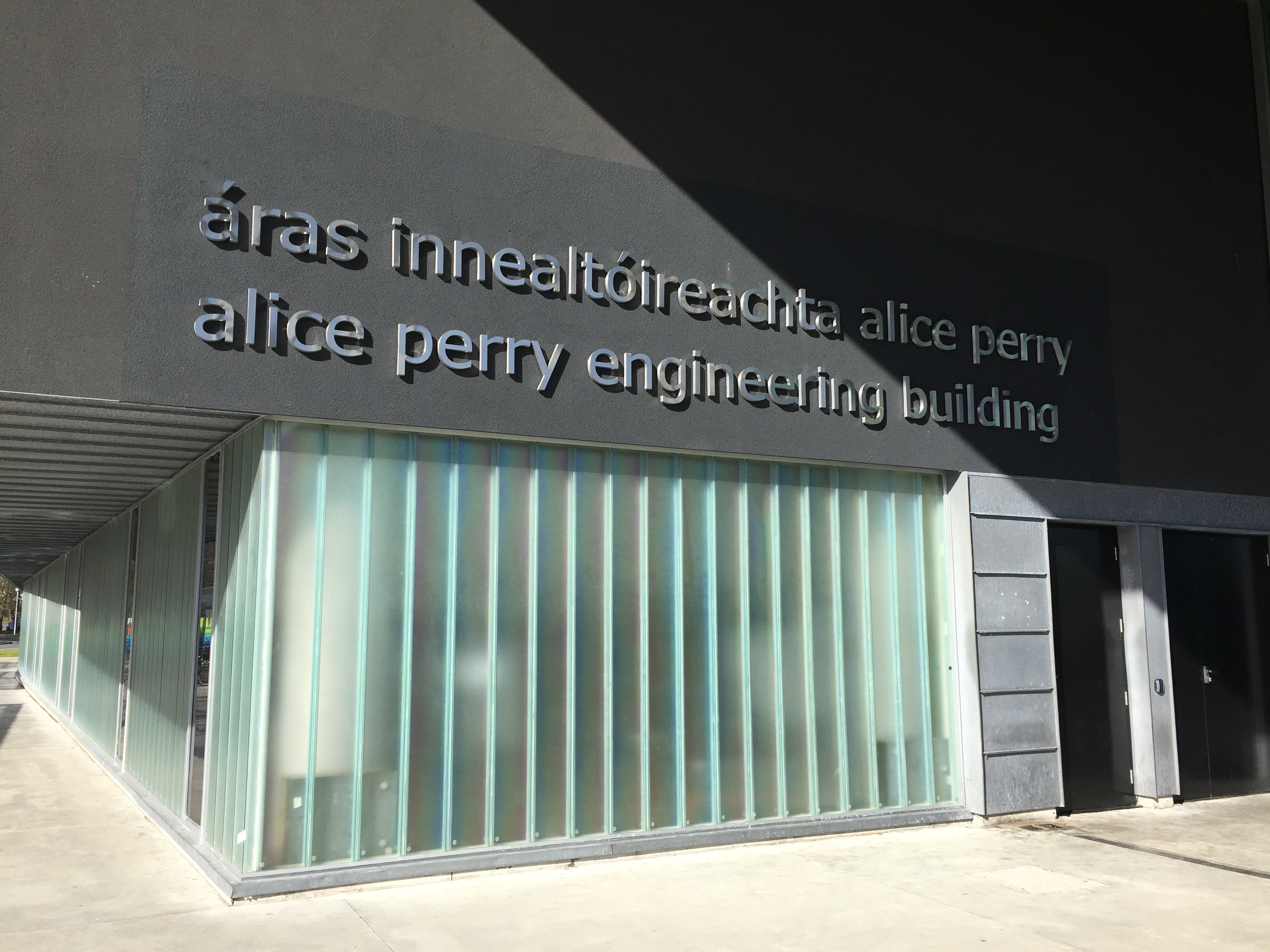
Alice Perry building NUI galway

Her nephew, Joss Lynam, donated a collection of her poetry to NUI Galway in 1996. An All-Ireland medal has been named in her honour, The Alice Perry Medal, with the first prizes awarded in 2014.

On Monday 6 March 2017, NUI Galway held an official ceremony to mark the naming of the Alice Perry Engineering Building.

== Publications ==
- The children of Nazareth : and other poems (c1930)
- The morning meal and other poems (1939)
- Mary in the garden and other poems (1944)
- One thing I know and other poems (c. 1953)
- Women of Canaan and other poems (1961)

== See also ==
- Women in engineering
