= Rita de Morais Sarmento =

Portuguese civil engineer (1872–1931)

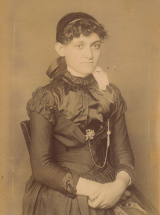
- Born: 11 February 1872; Porto
- Died: 28 March 1931; Lisbon
- Occupation: Civil engineer

Rita de Morais Sarmento (11 February 1872 – 28 March 1931) was a Portuguese civil engineer, the first woman to earn a degree in the subject in Portugal and probably the first woman to graduate as a chartered engineer in Europe.

== Early life ==
Rita de Morais Sarmento was born in the city of Porto in 1872, to an Aveiro family with liberal constitutionalist views who had suffered as a result of the Portuguese Liberal Wars (1828 to 1834), fought between constitutionalists and absolutists over the succession to the Portuguese throne.

Rita was the youngest of five children of Anselmo Evaristo de Morais Sarmento, a journalist and graphic artist, and Rita de Cássia de Oliveira. Her father edited the liberal left wing periodicals "Gazeta Literária do Porto" and "A Actualidade" and later the "A Ideia Nova – diário democrático". The household was a gathering place for his friends and colleagues, who were part of the liberal cultural and political scene, including Oliveira Martins, Ramalho Ortigão, Camilo Castelo Branco, Antero de Quental and Teófilo Braga.

== Education ==
The family had a strong belief in the value of education and of service for the public good. After attending private schools in Porto, alongside her siblings, Rita enrolled to study Civil Engineering and Public Works at the Academia Politécnica de Oporto (the Polytechnic Academy in Porto) when she was 15 years old. Her sisters Laurinda, Aurélia and Guilhermina also went into the scientific field, training to become some of the earliest women doctors in Portugal. The two eldest opened a short lived medical clinic for women and children in the early 1890s.

== University ==
Rita de Morais Sarmento completed her degree in Civil Engineering and Public Works in 1894, receiving distinctions in some of the categories, and frequently scoring at the top of her class. Two years later, on 30 July 30, 1896, she applied to the university for a "Carta de Capacidade" the equivalent of chartered or licensed engineer certification for professional purposes. This was a particularly noteworthy achievement and a significant first for a woman, and was covered by several Portuguese newspapers. Within the next few years, women in other European countries earned engineering degrees. Agnes Klingberg and Betzy Meyer (Denmark, 1897), Alice Perry (Ireland, 1906) and Elisa Leonida Zamfirescu (Romanian student in Germany, 1912)

== Career ==
Rita de Morais Sarmento never really worked as a professional civil engineer, partly due to her fragile heath, coupled with the difficulties in getting work as a female engineer in conservative Portuguese society.

== Marriage ==
She settled in the city of Lisbon after her marriage in late 1898 to António dos Santos Lucas, professor, future director of the Lisbon Faculty of Sciences, and for a brief time Minister of Finance in 1914. They had children. Her father and sister Guilhermina signed as witnesses to the marriage, Guilhermina de Moraes Sarmento giving her profession as doctor.

Rita de Morais Sarmento died at 59 years of age in 1931 and was buried in the Prazeres Cemetery in Lisbon.
