= Heidi Ploeg =

Canadian biomechanical engineer

Heidi-Lynn Ploeg (born 1965) is a Canadian biomechanical engineer, a professor in the Department of Mechanical and Materials Engineering and Chair for Women in Engineering at Smith Engineering, the engineering faculty of Queen's University at Kingston in Ontario. Her research involves the biomechanics of bone and bone implants, and the use of motion capture in biomedical applications.

== Education and career ==
Ploeg was a student of mechanical engineering at Queen's University. She earned a bachelor's degree there in 1988, and a master's degree in 1991. From 1992 to 2002 she worked as a researcher and project manager for Centerpulse Orthopedics, a Swiss company in Winterthur; during this time she continued her studies at Queen's University, and completed a Ph.D. in 2000.

From 2003 to 2018 she worked at the University of Wisconsin–Madison as an assistant and associate professor of mechanical engineering. In 2018 she returned to Queen's University as an associate professor, and in 2022 she was promoted to full professor. She was named as the inaugural Queen's Chair for Women in Engineering in 2020.

== Recognition ==
Ploeg was named as an ASME Fellow in 2021, and as a Fellow of the Orthopaedic Research Society in 2024.
