= Elizabeth Bragg =

American civil engineer

- Born: April 23, 1858; San Francisco, California, US
- Died: November 10, 1929 (aged 71)
- Burial place: Colma, California, US
- Education: University of California, Berkeley
- Occupation: Civil engineer
- Known for: First woman to receive a civil engineering degree from an American university
- Spouse: George Cumming (m. 1888)
- Children: 3

Elizabeth Bragg (April 23, 1858 – November 10, 1929) was the first woman to earn a civil engineering degree from an American university.

== Early life and education ==
Elizabeth Bragg was born into a wealthy family in San Francisco on April 23 1858. In her youth she showed great aptitude for mathematics and attended the high school that prepared students for the University of California at Berkeley.

Bragg received her degree in civil engineering from the University of California, Berkeley in 1876. Her thesis considered A Solution of a Peculiar Problem of Surveying.

== Personal life ==
After graduating, she became a teacher until her marriage to George Cumming in 1888, a civil engineer with the Southern Pacific Railroad Company and they had three sons.

Elizabeth Bragg Cumming died on 10 November 1929 at the age of 71.

== See also ==
- Julia Morgan
- Emily Warren Roebling
- Elmina Wilson
- Bertha Lamme Feicht
