= Juana Pereyra =

Uruguayan civil engineer (1897–1976)

- Born: 8 November 1897; Montevideo, Uruguay
- Died: 16 December 1976 (aged 79); Montevideo, Uruguay
- Education: Universidad de la República

Juana Pereyra (8 November 1897 - 16 December 1976) was a Uruguayan civil engineer, and one of the first women to graduate from the Faculty of Engineering of the Universidad de la República.

== Early life and education ==
Juana Pereyra was born in Montevideo, Uruguay on 8 November 1897. At school she excelled at mathematics. After the initial opposition of her family and having to overcome the difficulties that women had to face in the professional fields of the time, she enrolled in the Faculty of Engineering of the Universidad de la República, graduating with high marks with the title of Ingeniera de Puentes y Caminos (Engineer of Bridges and Roads) in November 1920, making her one of the first female engineers in South America.

== Career ==
Pereyra was a member of the Working Committee of the Consejo Nacional de Mujeres (the National Women's Council), which at that time was chaired by the feminist activist Paulina Luisi, the first Uruguayan woman to earn a medical degree in the country. In 1917, whilst still a student herself, Pereyra had started to teach mathematics and physics at the Universidad de Mujeres (Women's University). In 1924 Pereyra began working as a teacher of Bridge and Road engineering at the Faculty of Engineering of the Universidad de la República.

She later joined the technical team of the Dirección Nacional de Vialidad (National Roads Directorate), where she played a key part the teams working on significant projects such as the construction of the Centennial Bridge in Paso de los Toros in the department of Tacuarembó and bridge projects in Las Piedras, and in San Ramón over the Santa Lucia river. Her high-profile career led her to become a founding member of the Uruguayan Academia Nacional de Ingeniería (ANIU) from its foundation.

Juana Pereyra died in Montevideo on December 16, 1976.

== Legacy ==
Ing. Juana Pereyra Avenue in Montevideo was named in her honour.
