= Datasaab affair =

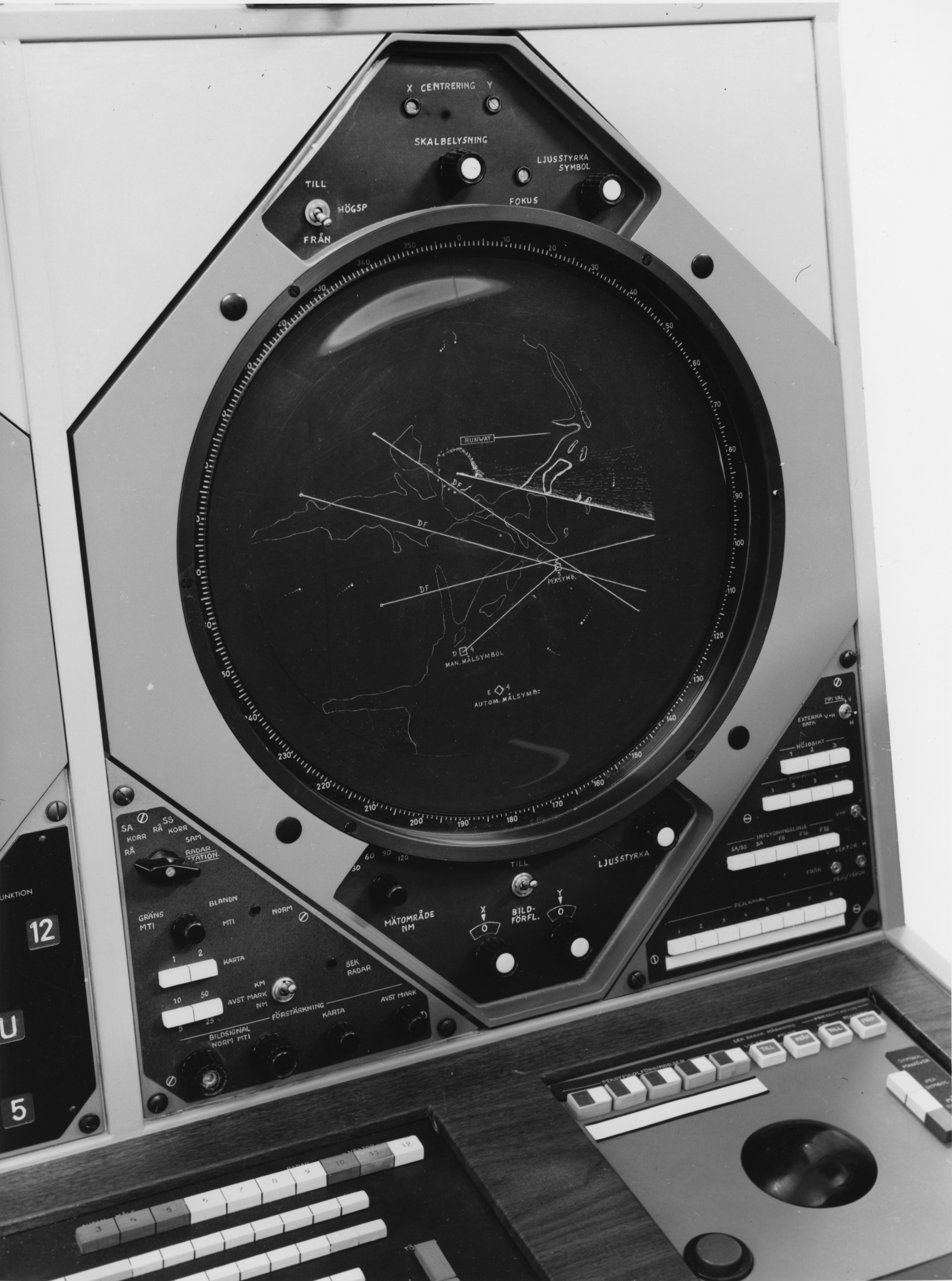
A plan position indicator (PPI) at Arlanda Airport, manufactured by Standard Radio & Telefon around 1965, part of the same type of system that was sold to the Soviet Union.

The Datasaab affair (Swedish: Datasaabaffären) was a political and export-control controversy involving the transfer of technology from Sweden to the Soviet Union during the Cold War. The affair centered on the sale of the TERCAS (Terminal and En Route Control Automated System) air traffic control system by the Swedish company Stansaab to the Soviet state organization Elektronorgtechnica in the mid-1970s. The system was intended for use at airports in Moscow, Kyiv, and Mineralnye Vody and represented one of the largest Swedish technology exports to the Soviet Union at the time.

Because the TERCAS system incorporated certain components manufactured in the United States, the export was subject to American re-export regulations. In connection with the sale, the Swedish government agreed to monitor the transfer of technology covered by these restrictions and to ensure that the necessary authorizations were obtained before such components were delivered to the Soviet Union.

Subsequent investigations found that a number of circuit boards containing restricted American components had been transferred without the required re-export authorization. The matter became public in 1980, by which time Stansaab had been merged into Datasaab, giving rise to the name "Datasaab affair." The disclosure led to investigations by Swedish and American authorities, diplomatic discussions between Sweden and the United States, and legal and financial consequences for the companies involved. The affair remains a notable example of the challenges associated with international technology transfers and export-control regulations during the Cold War.

== Background ==
In 1975, Stansaab won a large contract from Elektronorgtechnica in the Soviet Union for an air traffic control system called TERCAS (Terminal and En Route Control Automated System) for Moscow, Kyiv, and Mineralnye Vody. The value of the contract was 314 million Swedish kronor and included the construction of radar towers and the training of personnel, with BPA and ASEA serving as subcontractors.

TERCAS was an entirely Swedish-designed system built around the Censor 932 V computer (also known as Censor 9103 or C 932 V). It included so-called radar extractors, which converted the analog signal from a radar into a digital signal that could be processed by a computer. These extractors contained certain American-made components.

== The export ==
While the large Soviet air traffic control project was being carried out in 1977, Stansaab encountered difficulties in delivering all the components required for the order because several of the circuit boards contained American-made components that required re-export licenses due to the United States' export embargo against the Soviet Union. In August 1977, Foreign Minister Karin Söder negotiated with the United States regarding the export permit. At the initiative of CEO Gunnar Wedell, Stansaab reduced the system's functionality and obtained an export license on the condition that the Swedish government would seek written approval before each delivery of the affected technology to the Soviet Union.

What had been removed from the export license were 24 circuit boards that were essential to the operation of the system. These boards contained components that still lacked export authorization. The boards were so-called primary radar extractors, used to identify all aircraft within an airspace. In the West, secondary radar extractors were commonly used. These made military aircraft invisible to civilian radar, but they required civilian aircraft to be equipped with a special transponder, which was not installed on all Soviet aircraft. Primary radar extractors, by contrast, were fully effective for detecting all aircraft, including military ones, and were therefore necessary for the Soviet Union, since it needed to be able to see all aircraft in its airspace on the radar system. The boards contained several sensitive components. One component that has been specifically mentioned was a 64-bit memory chip from AMD (Advanced Micro Devices), which was allegedly deliberately relabeled to appear as though it had been manufactured by the Swedish circuit manufacturer RIFA AB instead. At this stage, a delegation of Swedish technicians took the 24 circuit boards to Moscow to test the system and later claimed that they had forgotten to bring them back to Sweden.

Wedell initially claimed that the Soviet Union had replaced the missing parts with its own technology. However, he eventually admitted: "We never applied for the final license. The technicians who were supposed to test-run the installation carried the last crucial circuit boards in their hand luggage and traveled back and forth with them to the Soviet Union. In the end, the boards remained there."

== The disclosure ==
The Ministry of Industry had received its first reports of irregularities within Datasaab in October 1979 from company employees. Industry Minister Nils G. Åsling and State Secretary Robert Nilsson were informed in January 1980.

The revelations concerning the circuit boards and other irregularities at Datasaab were first published in the newspaper Internationalen on 22 October 1980. On the evening of 30 October 1980, the unauthorized export was reported on Aktuellt, a news program of Sveriges Television. As a result, on 5 November, the United States, through George S. Vest, requested a formal denial from the Swedish government. The government issued a denial, but the United States was not satisfied. During a visit to the United States, State Secretary for Foreign Affairs Leif Leifland was informed that the United States wanted the matter to be thoroughly investigated.

== Consequences ==
On 1 April 1980, Datasaab's new chairman, Håkan Ledin, appointed by the company's new owner Ericsson, was asked by the United States how the radar extractors had ended up in the Soviet Union. On 1 May 1981, Ericsson reported to the Ministry of Industry that Datasaab had violated its export license.

On 30 June 1981, the Swedish government was forced to acknowledge that an unauthorized export of technology had taken place and apologized to the United States through the American embassy. This led to a prolonged diplomatic crisis between Sweden and the United States. Richard Perle claimed that the export had forced the United States to revise its war planning, and the United States refused to sell the AIM-9L Sidewinder missile and the engine intended for the Saab 39 Gripen to Sweden.

According to author Mikael Holmström, the Swedish air traffic control system may have been used during the Soviet invasion of Afghanistan. Holmström also interviewed an anonymous Pentagon official responsible for Nordic affairs at the time, who claimed that Soviet air defenses had been relatively weak before Sweden violated the export embargo. The same source further stated that the technology transfer exposed Sweden to direct danger in the event of a conflict.

Datasaab's then-CEO Gunnar Wedell consistently rejected, from the 1980s onward, the allegation that Sweden had exported militarily useful technology to the Soviet Union. His position was that the Soviet military was highly capable and possessed technology of a quality comparable to the civilian air traffic control systems delivered by Datasaab. He also emphasized that the systems were entirely Swedish-designed, even though they contained American components, and argued that the components themselves were not especially advanced. He likened the United States reaction to "interfering in the construction of a house because you sold the nails." Wedell further argued that the affair attracted so much attention because Datasaab (then Stansaab) had won the TERCAS contract over UNIVAC, which had expected to secure the deal and suffered a loss of prestige when it failed to do so. According to him, UNIVAC subsequently helped bring the matter into the public spotlight through lobbying efforts. He also noted that the company Selenia had supplied similarly sensitive electronics to TERCAS without facing comparable restrictions.

The affair attracted significant attention in the United States because it was the first time a foreign company had been accused and convicted of violating United States export-control laws.

In April 1984, Ericsson, as Datasaab's new owner, was fined $3.15 million (equivalent to 32.5 million Swedish kronor at the time). Sweden was not permitted to purchase the Sidewinder missile until July 1984. Ericsson did not ultimately bear the cost of the fine itself. Through a clause in its purchase agreement with Saab, Ericsson had excluded liability for any irregularities committed by Datasaab. Of the total fine, the Swedish government paid 10 million kronor, while Saab-Scania paid 22.5 million kronor.

In the spring of 1996, TERCAS was still operating in Russia, and a ceremony was held in Moscow to celebrate the system's 15 years of service. In 2017, TERCAS was finally retired and replaced by a newly developed Russian system.
