= Alfaskop =

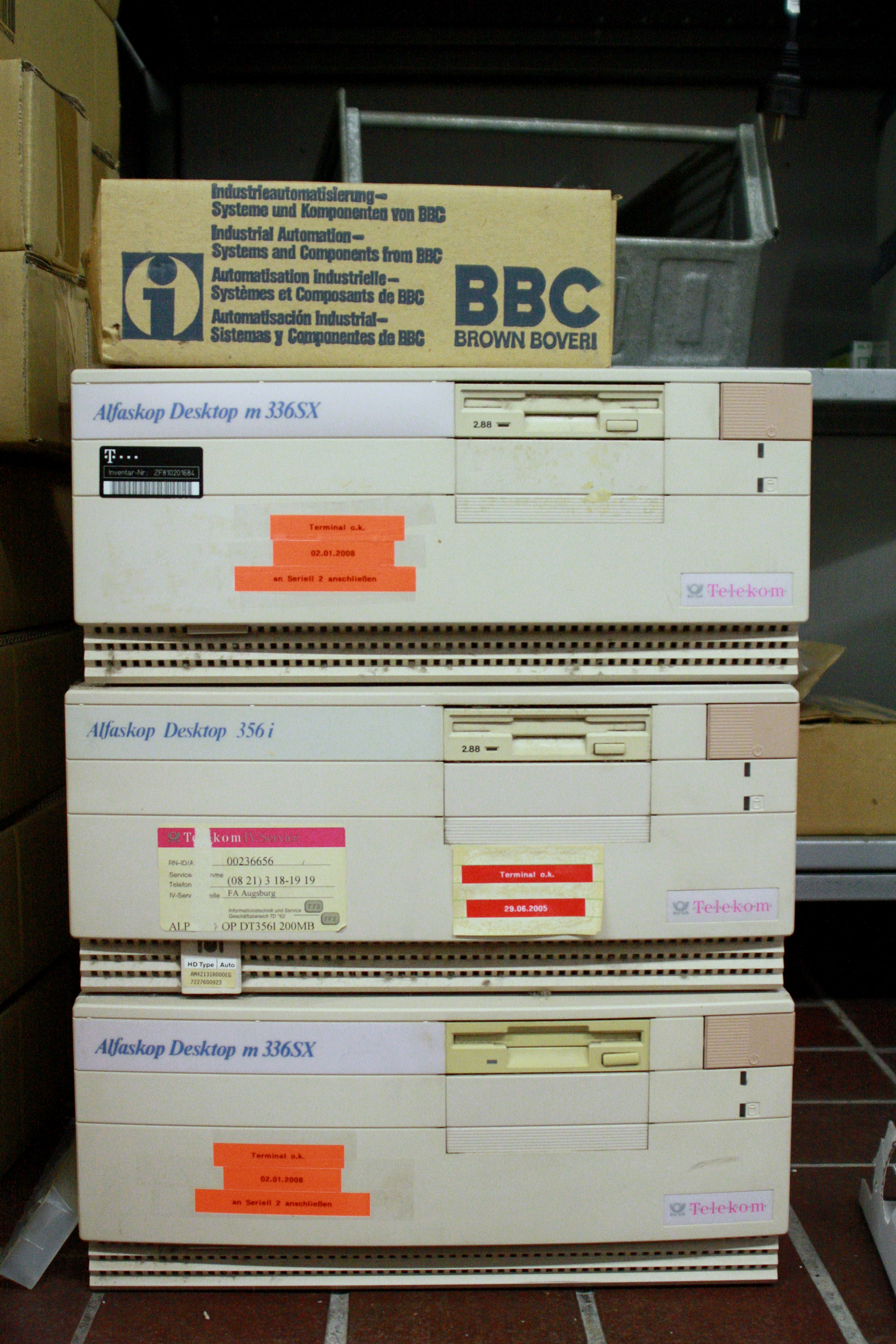
Alfaskop Data Terminals with 2.88 MB floppy drive

Alfaskop was a brand, developed in Sweden by Standard Radio & Telefon AB (SRT) and applied to data terminals and later IBM-compatible PCs. The term was also used to name Alfaskop AB, a listed Swedish IT services company., that filed for bankruptcy in 2001.

== History ==
SRT, owned by the ITT Corporation during the 1960s, specialised in Air Traffic Control systems and military radar systems. In 1971, SRT provided the core technology for Stansaab AS, a joint venture with Saab and the state-owned Swedish Development Company. The company's primary focus was systems for real-time data applied to commercial and aviation applications. To this was added the data terminal operations of Facit in 1972. The Alfaskop terminals quickly gained a foothold in the market for airline reservations with 1,000 in use at Scandinavian Airlines alone.

In 1978, Stansaab was merged with the Data Saab division of Saab to form Datasaab. In 1981, Ericsson, believing that growth in telecoms would be lower than that in IT, purchased Datasaab and integrated it with two of its own divisions to form Ericsson Information Systems (EIS). Accurately predicting convergence between telephony and data technologies, EIS instructed the Alfaskop group to begin working on a design for Ericsson's first PC – the EPC, which was released 16 months later in 1984.

Following market difficulties in the United States, particularly with a disappointing launch of its PC, Ericsson decided to abandon its "paperless office" strategy. In 1988, the division was sold to Nokia and later to ICL in 1990. The final act was its sale by ICL to Wyse Technology who eventually wound down manufacturing.

== The Alfaskop range ==
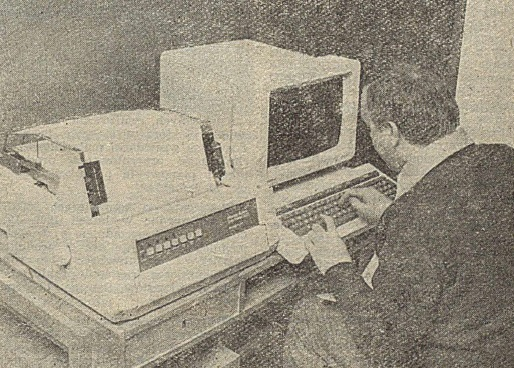
Alfaskop terminal

Due to its work for the aviation industry, one of SRT's core competencies was the display of radar images. It was this expertise that led to the development of the Alfaskop terminal, which was inspired by the launch of IBM's range of display terminals. These terminals made interaction with computers much easier than with earlier punched card or paper tape interfaces. The alphanumeric, 80 character, 24 line terminal quickly became a standard. The Alfaskop terminals were designed to be pin compatible with the IBM equipment. The Alfaskop 3100, the first model, was designed to compete with the IBM 2260, while the later 3500 was developed in response to the IBM 3270. There followed a refreshed 3500 called System 37 followed by a System 41 – a new design. The 3500 series were also produced in Poland under the name MERA 7900.

The first Ericsson PC - the EPC, was released at the CeBit fair in Hanover in 1984. The Ericsson Portable PC followed a year later. In subsequent years, with the growth in demand for IBM-compatible PCs, several Alfaskop PC models were released.

While Ericsson had tried to build its own brand in the PC business, Nokia was willing to trade on the Alfaskop name. By 1989, they were showing the "Alfaskop Workgroup System" comprising 80386-based servers, 80286-based desktops and Ethernet or Token Ring networking. Office software included the X400-compatible Alfaskop Mail, WordPerfect and Lotus Freelance. The systems were offered with either MS-DOS or OS/2.

== Commercial success ==
The Alfaskop terminals enjoyed considerable success, even outselling IBM in some markets, particularly in Sweden. By the early 1980s the company had accumulated profits of about one billion kronor. Customers included airlines, newspapers, police, councils and telecommunications companies.

A key benefit of the terminals was that they were IBM compatible but cost less. This meant discounts for volume customers made the terminals attractive. Reflecting the profit contribution made by Alfaskop (other product ranges at Stansaab/Datasaab were losing money), Ericsson invested 40 million kronor in the manufacturing facility at Järfälla outside Stockholm. Ericsson had predicted that their Eritex workstation comprising a telex and data terminal would take over from Alfaskop but demand continued with 100,000 units sold by 1983 with annual sales climbing above 25,000. Eritex was retired by the mid-1980s. Deliveries of Alfaskop continued through the Nokia years and by the time production ceased, more than 900 000 units had been shipped.

== Alfaskop AB ==
From 1990, Nokia Data encouraged the development of several franchise partners to drive sales of PCs and network technologies. From 1994 these companies were co-operating closely and delivering network technologies, Microsoft solutions, and systems integration. In 1995, these companies were merged to form Alfaskop AB. In 1997, the company was listed on the Stockholm Stock Exchange.

By 2000, Alfaskop had 660 employees with 18 offices in Sweden. However, by 2001, the company was bankrupt and its remaining 400 employees were laid off. Business Wire reported that about half of the employees found employment at Meteorit AB, another IT consultancy.
