= Larry F. Weber =

American electrical engineer and businessman

- Occupations: electrical engineer; businessman

Larry F. Weber, is an American electrical engineer and businessman.

Weber has devoted his 30-year professional career to the advancement and promotion of plasma displays. He was a founder of Plasmaco, Inc. in 1987 with Stephen Globus and James Kehoe, and since then has held various positions at the company. In 1996, when Plasmaco was acquired by Matsushita Electric Industrial Co., Ltd, he was named president and CEO. Prior to establishing Plasmaco, Dr. Weber studied under Donald Bitzer and was a research associate professor at the University of Illinois at Urbana-Champaign, where he directed the Plasma Display Research Group after receiving BS, MS and Ph.D. degrees in Electrical Engineering. He has been selected to receive the prestigious Society for Information Display (SID) Karl Ferdinand Braun Prize. The award was presented to Dr. Weber on May 15, at the 2000 SID International Symposium in Long Beach, CA. Dr. Weber is receiving the award “For pioneering contributions to Plasma Display Panel technology and its commercialization”. Each year, SID presents the Karl Ferdinand Braun Prize to one individual worldwide, in recognition of outstanding technical achievement in, or contribution to, display technology. The award is the highest honor awarded by the society, and the recipient is selected based on the recommendation of the SID Honors and Awards Committee.

Dr. Weber has published 40 papers and holds 13 patents on plasma displays, including one for the energy recovery sustain circuit used in all current color PDP products manufactured worldwide. He is a recognized leader in the display community, serving on several SID committees and was General Chairman of the 1988 International Display Research Conference. In 1990 Dr. Weber was elected a SID Fellow. He has received numerous awards for his work on plasma displays including SID's Special Recognition Award in 1982 and again 1995.

The Plasmaco name was dropped in 2004 and is currently known as Panasonic Plasma Display Laboratory of America (PPDLA). Larry Weber, while not with the company any longer, is still working towards developing plasma TV improvements. Panasonic has also announced the closure of the original factory where all of Larry's developments took place. The plant on South St in Highland New York has stopped all development and manufacture of plasma displays.
