= Roxen =

Roxen may refer to:

- Roxen (lake), a lake in south central Sweden, north of the city Linköping
- Roxen (band), a Pakistani music band
- Roxen (singer), a Romanian singer
- Roxen (web server), a free software web server
