= Dansk Biografisk Leksikon =

Danish biographical dictionary

Dansk Biografisk Leksikon (usually abbreviated DBL; title of first edition written Dansk biografisk Lexikon) is a Danish biographical dictionary that has been published in three editions. The first edition, Dansk biografisk Lexikon, tillige omfattende Norge for tidsrummet 1537–1814 ("...including Norway for the period 1537–1814") was published in nineteen volumes 1887–1905 under the editorship of the historian Carl Frederik Bricka. The first edition, which is in the public domain is available online at Projekt Runeberg.

Later editions were published 1933–1934 (27 volumes) and 1979–1984 (16 volumes). While some of the biographies from the previous editions have been updated in the third edition, many others – considered of less contemporary relevance – were left out and need to be consulted in its predecessors.

== Editions ==
- Dansk biografisk Lexikon, tillige omfattende Norge for tidsrummet 1537–1814, editor: C. F. Bricka, 19 volumes, Copenhagen:Gyldendal, 1887–1905
- Dansk biografisk Leksikon, 2nd edition, 27 volumes, editors: Povl Engelstoft and Svend Dahl, Copenhagen, 1933–44.
- Dansk biografisk leksikon, 3rd edition, 16 volumes, editor: Svend Cedergreen Bech, Copenhagen, 1979–84.

== Online access ==
Searchable online access to the articles, some of which have been updated, is available from Gyldendal's Den Store Danske website.

== See also ==
- List of Danish online encyclopedic resources
