= Stansaab =

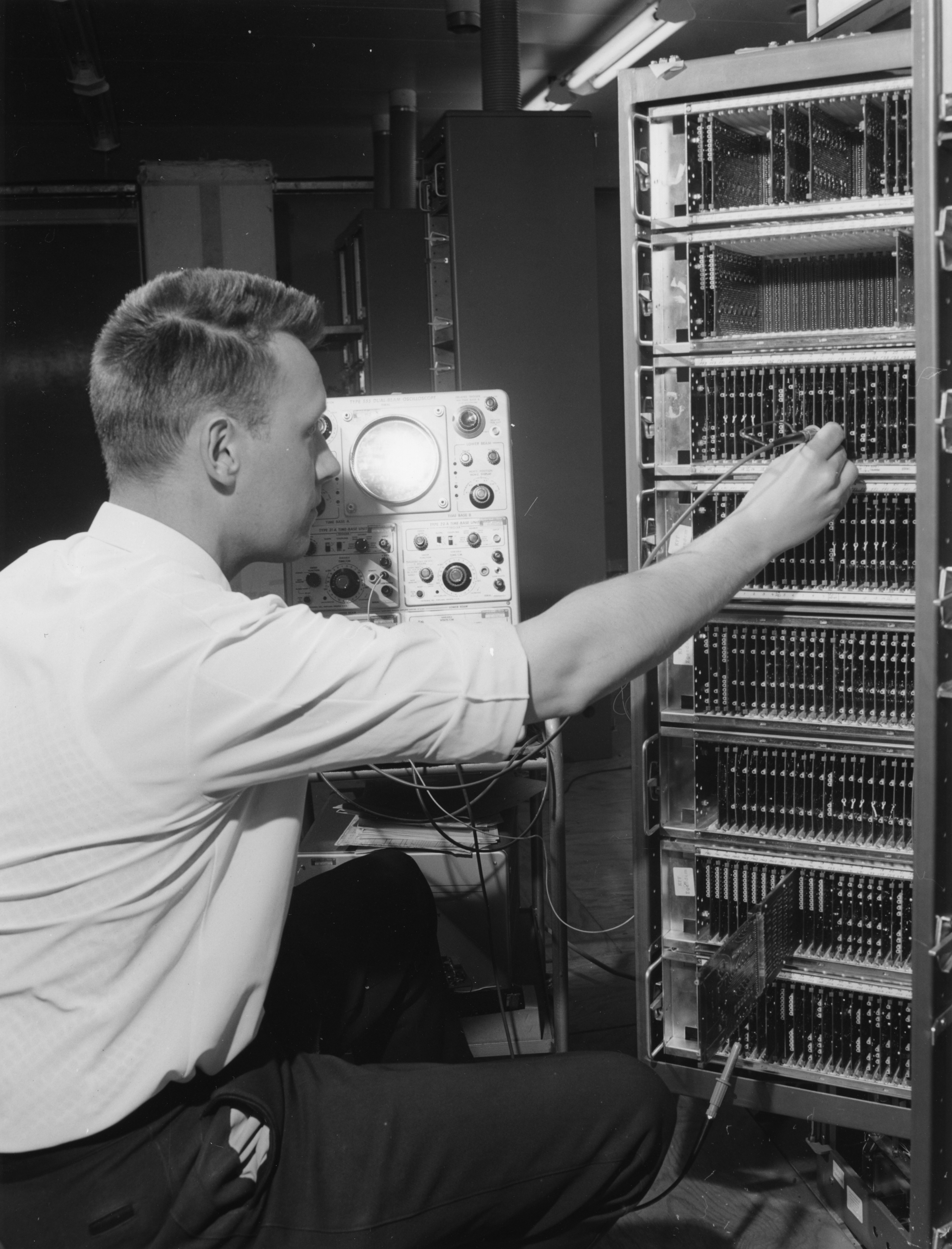
Maintenance of a Stansaab "Censor" computer, 1964

Stansaab AB was a company founded in 1971 in Barkarby, outside Stockholm, Sweden. The company was a joint venture between Standard Radio & Telefon AB (SRT), Saab-Scania, the car and aeroplane manufacturer and the state-owned Swedish Development Company. The company’s primary focus was systems for real-time data applied to commercial and aviation applications. In 1972, the company purchased the data terminal operations of Facit.

In 1978, it was merged with the Data Saab division of Saab to create Datasaab. In 1981, Ericsson, believing that growth in telecoms would be lower than that in IT, purchased Datasaab and integrated it with two of its own divisions to form Ericsson Information Systems (EIS).

One of the most successful products of the company was the Alfaskop range of data terminals.
