= EPPC =

EPPC may stand for:

- Environmental Planning and Protection Committee, a body of the Canadian Council of Ministers of the Environment
- Ericsson Portable PC
- Ethics and Public Policy Center
- Exhaust pulse pressure charging
