= H. Gene Slottow =

American professor of electric engineering and inventor

Hiram Gene Slottow (1921–1989) was a professor of electrical engineering at the University of Illinois at Urbana–Champaign. He was the co-inventor of the plasma display.

After completing his bachelor's degree in physics from the University of Chicago, he completed MS in electrical engineering from the Johns Hopkins University and PhD in electrical engineering from the University of Illinois at Urbana–Champaign. He was a professor of electrical engineering at Illinois from 1968 to 1986. He was also employed as an electrical engineer at the Coordinated Science Laboratory and the Computer-Based Education Research Laboratory from 1968 to 1986.

He won the 2003 Emmy Award in Technical Achievement for the invention of the plasma display. In 2013, he was inducted into the National Inventors Hall of Fame.
