= Datasaab D2 =

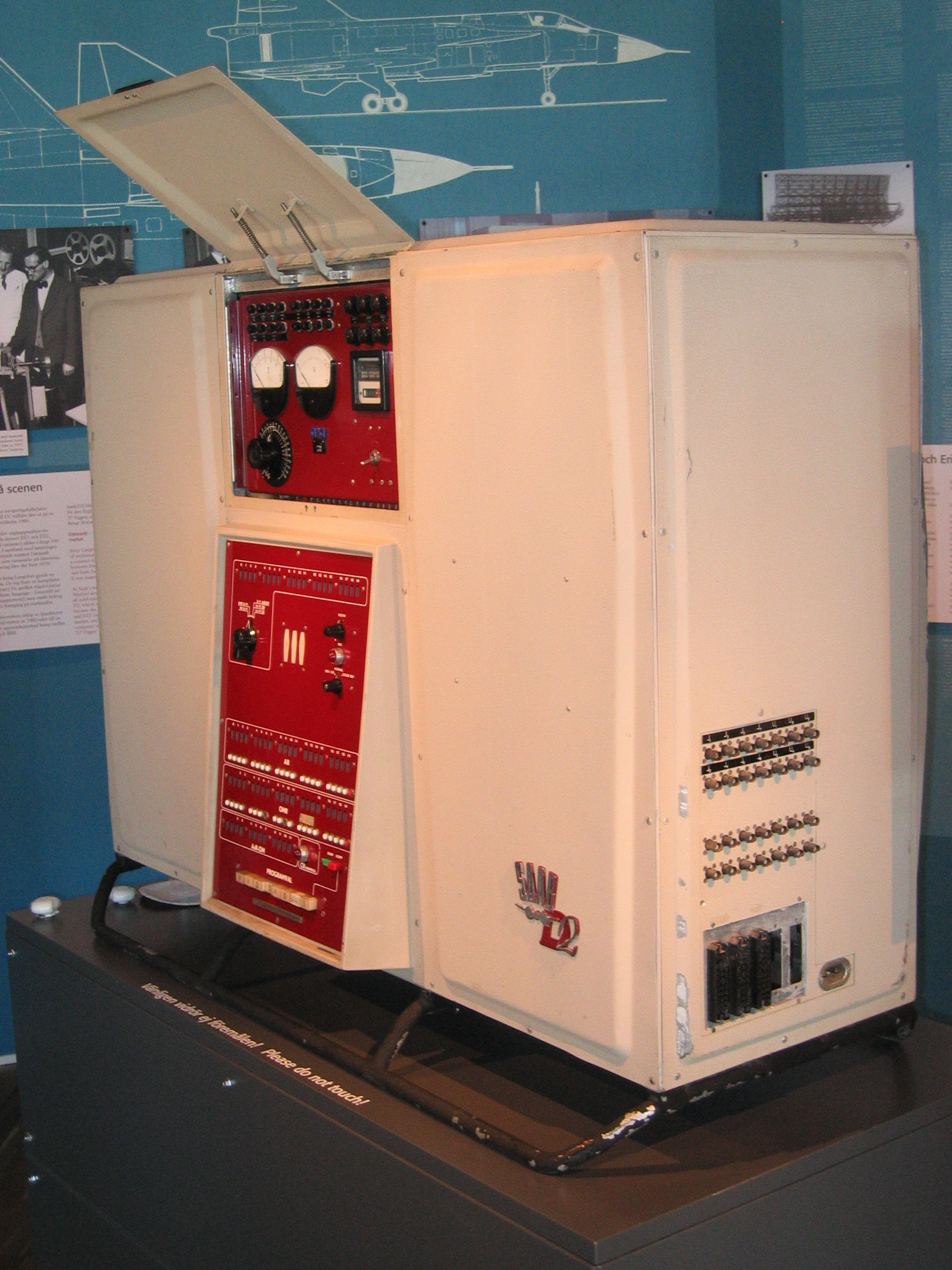
Datasaab D2 computer at IT-ceum

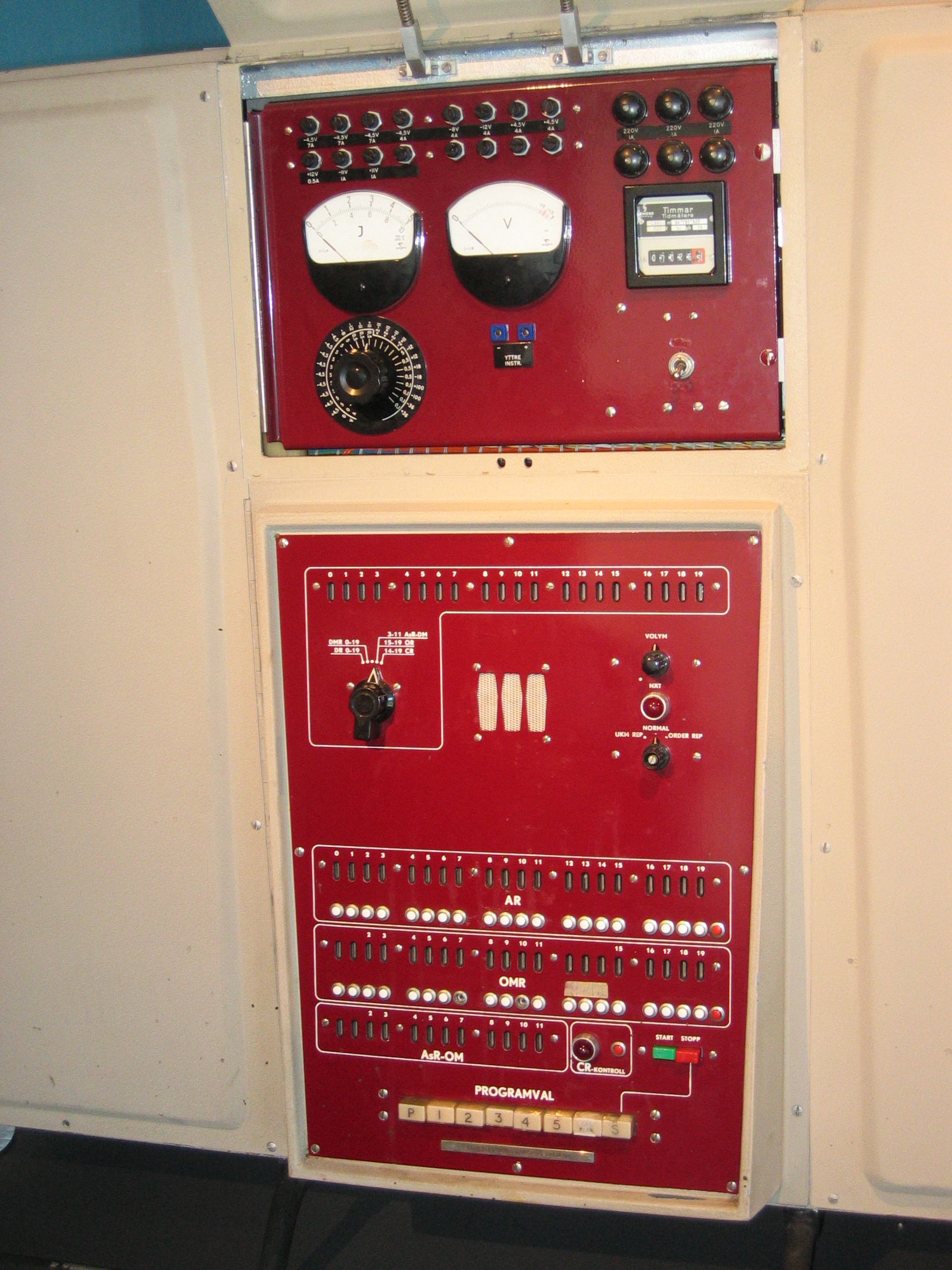
Front panel

D2 was a concept and prototype computer designed by Datasaab in Linköping, Sweden. It was built with discrete transistors and completed in 1960. Its purpose was to investigate the feasibility of building a computer for use in an aircraft to assist with navigation, ultimately leading to the design of the CK37 computer used in Saab 37 Viggen. This military side of the project was known as SANK, or Saabs Automatiska Navigations-Kalkylator (Saab's Automatic Navigational-Calculator), and D2 was the name for its civilian application.

The D2 weighed approximately 200 kg, and could be placed on a desktop. It used words of 20 bits corresponding to 6 decimal digits. The memory capacity was 6K words, corresponding to 15 kilobytes. Programs and data were stored in separate memories. It could perform 100,000 integer additions per second. Paper tape was used for input.

Experience from the D2 prototype was the foundation for Datasaab's continued development both of the civilian D21 computer and military aircraft models. The commercial D21, launched already in 1962, used magnetic tape, 24 bit words, and unified program and data memory. Otherwise it was close to the D2 prototype, while a working airborne computer required a lot more miniaturization.

The D2 is on exhibit at IT-ceum, the computer museum in Linköping, Sweden.
