= Lysator =

Computer club, Linköping University, Sweden

- Formation: 1973
- Location: Linköping, Sweden
- Projects: Project Runeberg; LysKOM; Elfwood; NannyMUD; Sprite Animation Toolkit
- Website: lysator.liu.se

Lysator is an academic computer club at Linköping University, Sweden with almost 600 members. It is an independent non-profit society, separate from the students' union and the faculties of the university.

== History ==
Lysator was founded on 29 March 1973. The first computer used at Lysator was a Datasaab D21, delivered to Lysator on 25 May 1973. Later in the decade, members of Lysator developed and initially built a microcomputer, the LYS-16, which was advanced for its time due to its 16-bit word size.

In February 1993, Lysator put up the first web server in Sweden, among the first 10–15 in the world.

On 30 July 2010, Lysator began migrating to a new 3U home rack, increasing their available storage space from 700GB to 13TB.

== Projects hosted by Lysator ==
Lysator has been a starting ground for many notable projects, some of which have since become independent from the club:

- Project Runeberg
- LysKOM
- Elfwood
- SvenskMud
- NannyMUD
- Sprite Animation Toolkit
- Pike (programming language)

== See also ==
- History of the Internet in Sweden
