= Den Store Danske Encyklopædi =

Danish encyclopedia

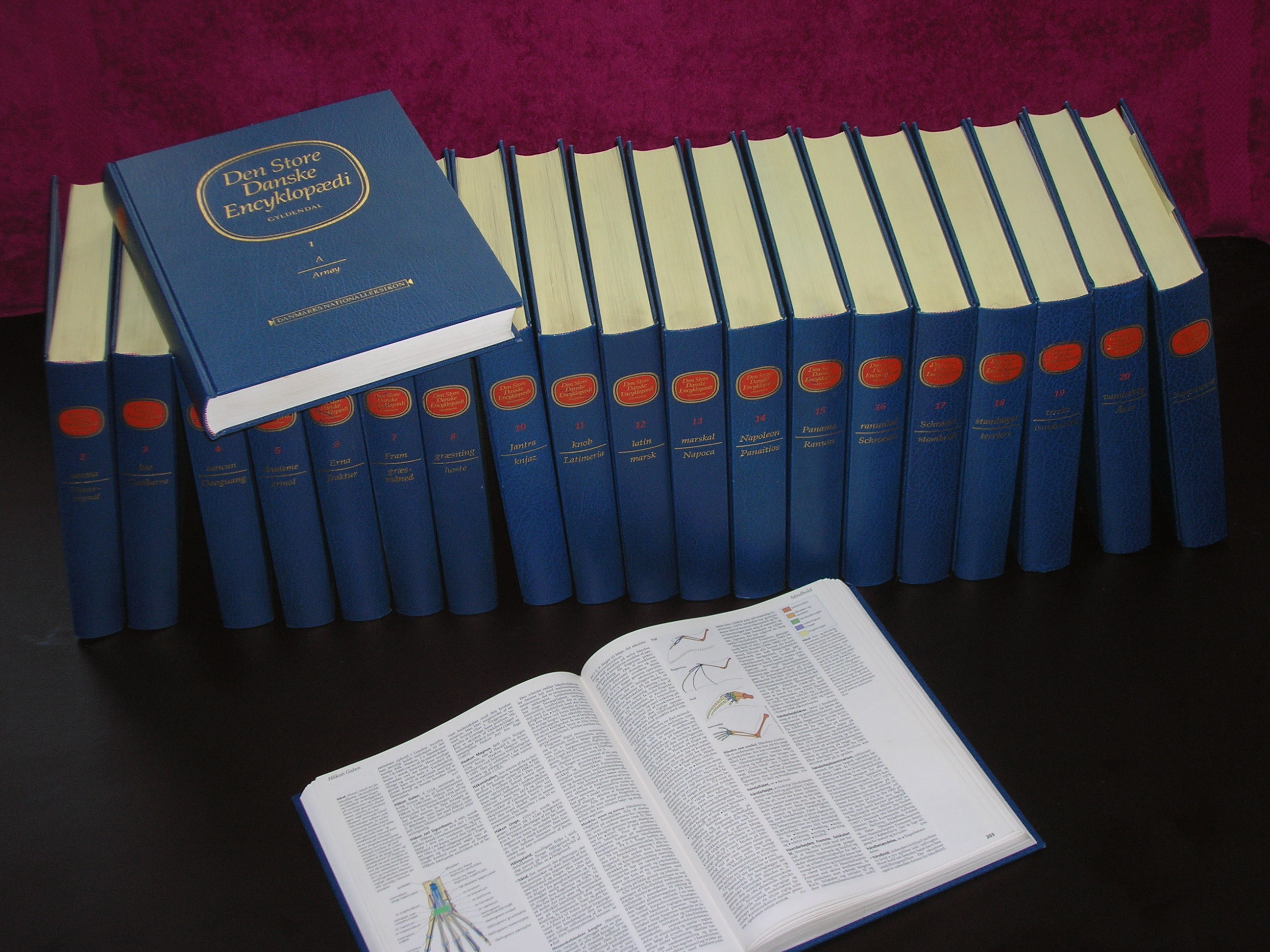
Den Store Danske Encyklopædi

Den Store Danske Encyklopædi (lit. 'The Great Danish Encyclopedia') is the most comprehensive contemporary Danish-language encyclopedia. The 20 volumes of the encyclopedia were published successively between 1994 and 2001; a one-volume supplement was published in 2002 and two index volumes in 2003. The work comprises 115,000 articles, ranging in size from single-line cross references to the 130-page entry on Denmark. The articles were written by a staff of about 4,000 academic experts led by editor-in-chief Jørn Lund. Articles longer than a few dozen lines are signed by their authors. Many articles are illustrated.

The encyclopedia was published by Danmarks Nationalleksikon A/S (Denmark's National Encyclopedia), a subsidiary of Denmark's publishing house Gyldendal that was set up for the purpose. The project was inspired by the almost contemporary Swedish Nationalencyklopedin; it received financial support from the Augustinus Foundation and was backed by a governmental inflation guarantee on pre-paid subscriptions. Eventually about 35,000 copies were sold.

An online version was available from 2009 to 2017, and its contents were incorporated into Lex – Denmark's National Encyclopedia when it launched in 2020.

== CD version ==
The text of the paper encyclopedia was also published, but without illustrations, on CD-ROMs for Microsoft Windows in 2004 and for macOS in 2005. In January 2006, it was announced that a full online edition of the encyclopedia was expected to be available in later 2006 on a subscription basis, with the help of a renewed grant from the Augustinus Foundation. In March 2008, the publishing house announced that it failed to get sufficient numbers of subscribers and declared the project a failure.

The CD-ROM version of the encyclopedia is likely not to work without an update on newer versions of Windows XP/Vista, due to a security fix from Microsoft.

== Online version ==
An online version of the encyclopedia was released on 26 February 2009 free of charge, generating revenue by displaying ads. It was published using wiki software, opening it up for user contributions. The decision to offer it free of charge was criticized by buyers of the DKK 25,000 (approx US$4,500 (2010)) paper encyclopedia, to whom the publishing house had originally pledged that a reduced-price paper version would never be released. The publishing house insists that all pledges are honored, as the free-of-charge version is web-based, and not a paper encyclopedia.

Gyldendal's vision is to create a hybrid between the traditional encyclopedia and user-generated encyclopedias like Wikipedia. While registered users may contribute with content and upload images, etc., a professional editorial staff maintain oversight over contributions. The status of an article is clearly flagged, if it is user-generated content or if it has been approved by the editorial staff. The vision is that the online version will be Danes' preferred choice for updated and trustworthy information, maintaining the status of a traditional encyclopedia. Gyldendal sought to recruit about 1,500 subject matter experts to verify user contributions to the about 161,000 articles – by March 2009 about 1,100 experts had been enrolled. The permanent editorial staff comprises 20 people.

In 2017 Gylendal decided it was too expensive to maintain the online version. The contents of the online version were incorporated into Lex – Denmark's National Encyclopedia when it launched in 2020.

== Copyright ==
The original articles from Den Store Danske Encyclopædi can be used freely but cannot be distributed or used commercially. The new articles (made by the users) can be used freely, provided the source is referenced using a deep link.

Den Store Danske is covered by Danish copyright law and belongs to Gyldendal.

== See also ==
- List of Danish online encyclopedic resources
