= Plasma display =

Type of flat-panel display

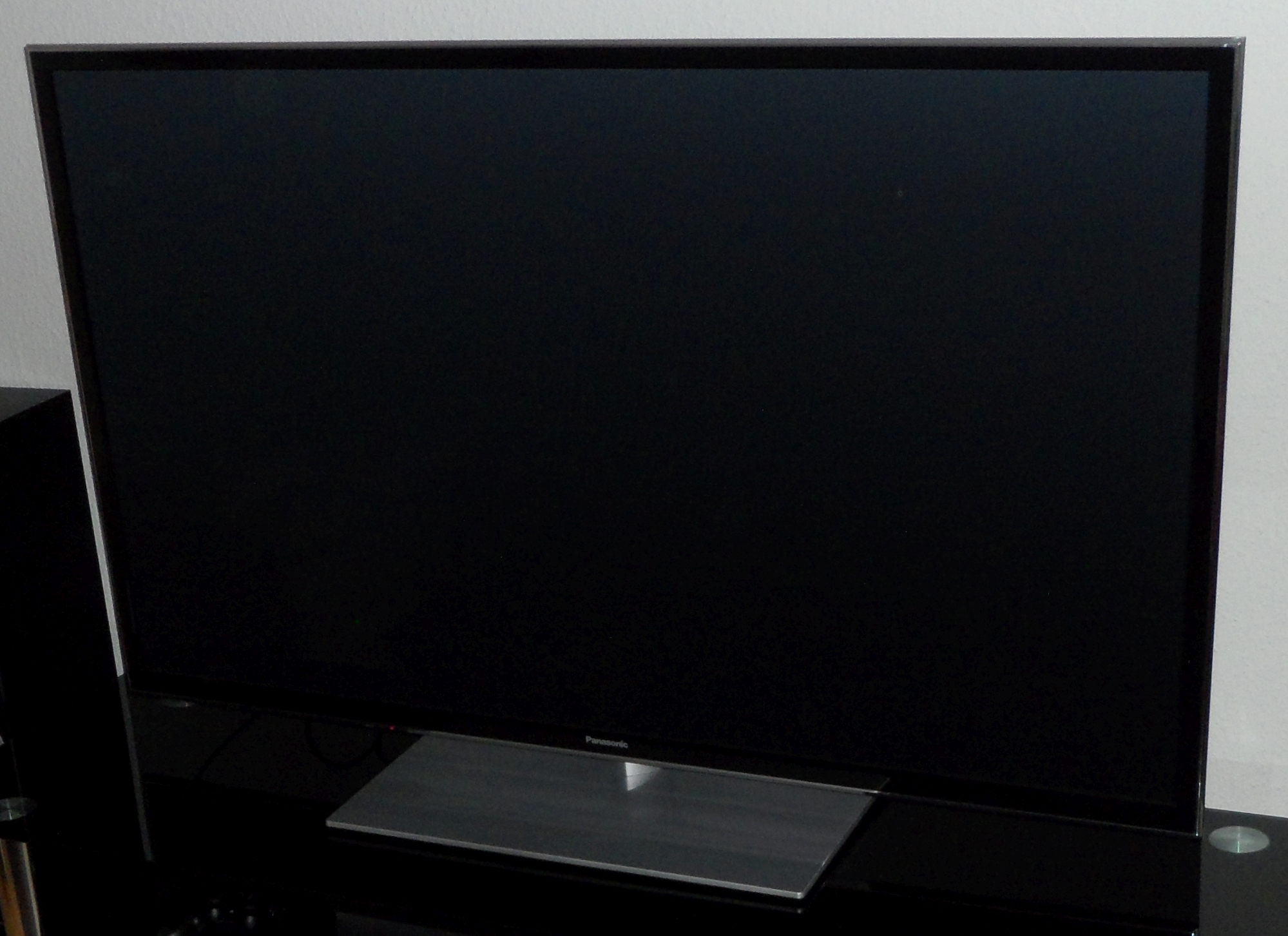
Last-generation Panasonic Plasma TV. 55” (140 cm) ST60 (TX-P55ST60E), released in 2013.

A plasma display panel (PDP) is a type of flat-panel display that uses small cells containing plasma (ionized gas) to produce an image. Each cell functions as a tiny fluorescent lamp, emitting ultraviolet (UV) light when the gas is energized by an electric current. The UV light then strikes phosphor coatings on the inside of the cells, causing them to emit visible light in red, green, or blue. Plasma televisions were the first large (over 32 inches/81 cm diagonal) flat-panel displays to be released to the public.

Plasma display technology was invented in the 1960s at the University of Illinois and were later made for niche use in luxurious monochrome computer monitors and terminals, before vanishing due to affordable color thin-film transistor liquid crystal displays (TFT LCDs). Planar neon plasma displays like Burroughs's Panaplex were also in use for a short while in handheld electronics like calculators and multimeters before being squeezed out by liquid-crystal display (LCD), vacuum fluorescent display (VFD) and light-emitting diode (LED) during the 1980s.

Fujitsu's research and development in cooperation with the University of Illinois and Japanese state broadcaster NHK led to the creation of a color plasma display that was first commercially tested in 1989. Large-sized wall-mounted displays became reality with both Fujitsu and Philips (using Fujitsu panels) releasing the first consumer PDPs in 1997. As expensive high-end items, plasma TVs never matched the popularity of cathode ray tube (CRTs) but found an appreciation among home cinema enthusiasts and falling prices helped it overtake rear-projection televisions. During the mid- and late-2000s, PDPs competed directly with LCDs in the battle of flat-panel displays, with Panasonic, LG and Samsung being the largest plasma TV makers, but improvements and falling costs of LCDs had eventually eroded plasma's market share almost entirely. Manufacturing of plasma displays for the United States retail market ended in 2014, and manufacturing for the Chinese market ended in 2016. Plasma displays are obsolete, having been superseded in most if not all aspects by organic light-emitting diode (OLED) displays.

== History ==
=== Early development ===
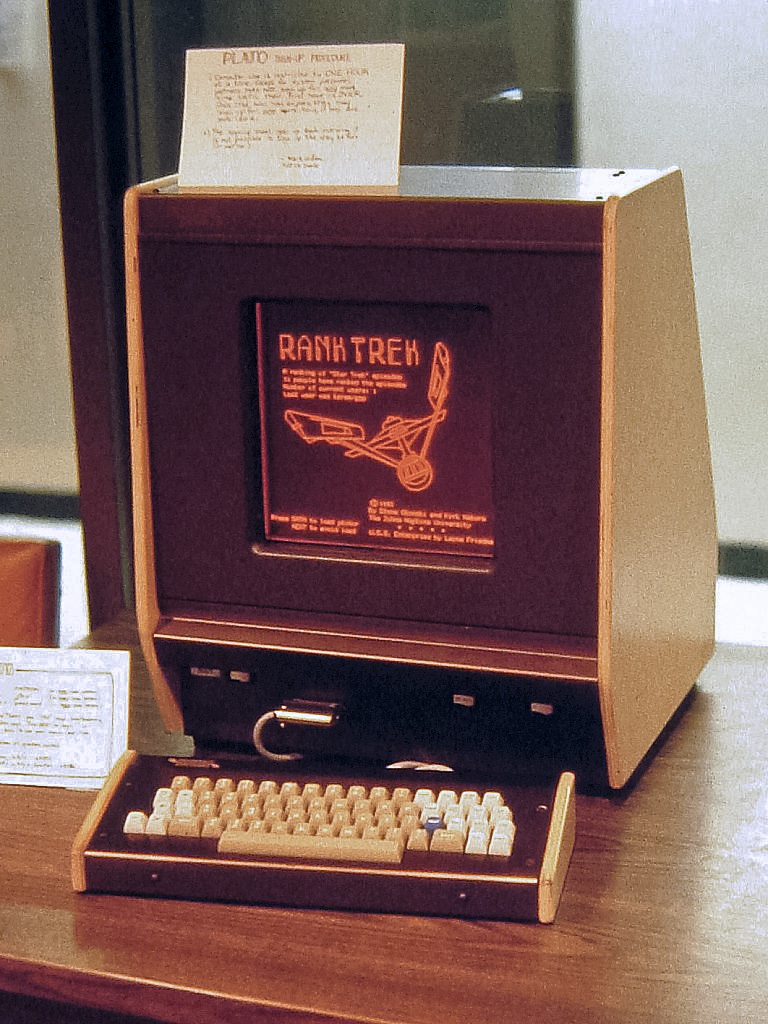
Plasma displays were first used in PLATO computer terminals. This PLATO V model illustrates the display's monochromatic orange glow seen in 1981.

Kálmán Tihanyi, a Hungarian engineer, described a proposed flat-panel plasma display system in a 1936 paper.

The first practical plasma video display was co-invented in 1964 at the University of Illinois at Urbana–Champaign by Donald Bitzer, H. Gene Slottow, and graduate student Robert Willson for the PLATO computer system. The goal was to create a display that had inherent memory to reduce the cost of the terminals. The original neon orange monochrome Digivue display panels built by glass producer Owens-Illinois were very popular in the early 1970s because they were rugged and needed neither memory nor circuitry to refresh the images. A long period of sales decline occurred in the late 1970s because semiconductor memory made CRT displays cheaper than the $2500 USD 512 × 512 PLATO plasma displays. Nevertheless, the plasma displays' relatively large screen size and 1 inch (25.4 mm) thickness made them suitable for high-profile placement in lobbies and stock exchanges.

Burroughs Corporation, a maker of adding machines and computers, developed the Panaplex display in the early 1970s. The Panaplex display, generically referred to as a gas-discharge or gas-plasma display, uses the same technology as later plasma video displays, but began life as a seven-segment display for use in adding machines. They became popular for their bright orange luminous look and found nearly ubiquitous use throughout the late 1970s and into the 1990s in cash registers, calculators, pinball machines, aircraft avionics such as radios, navigational instruments, and stormscopes; test equipment such as frequency counters and multimeters; and generally anything that previously used nixie tube or numitron displays with a high digit-count. These displays were eventually replaced by LEDs because of their low current-draw and module-flexibility, but are still found in some applications where their high brightness is desired, such as pinball machines and avionics.

=== 1980s ===
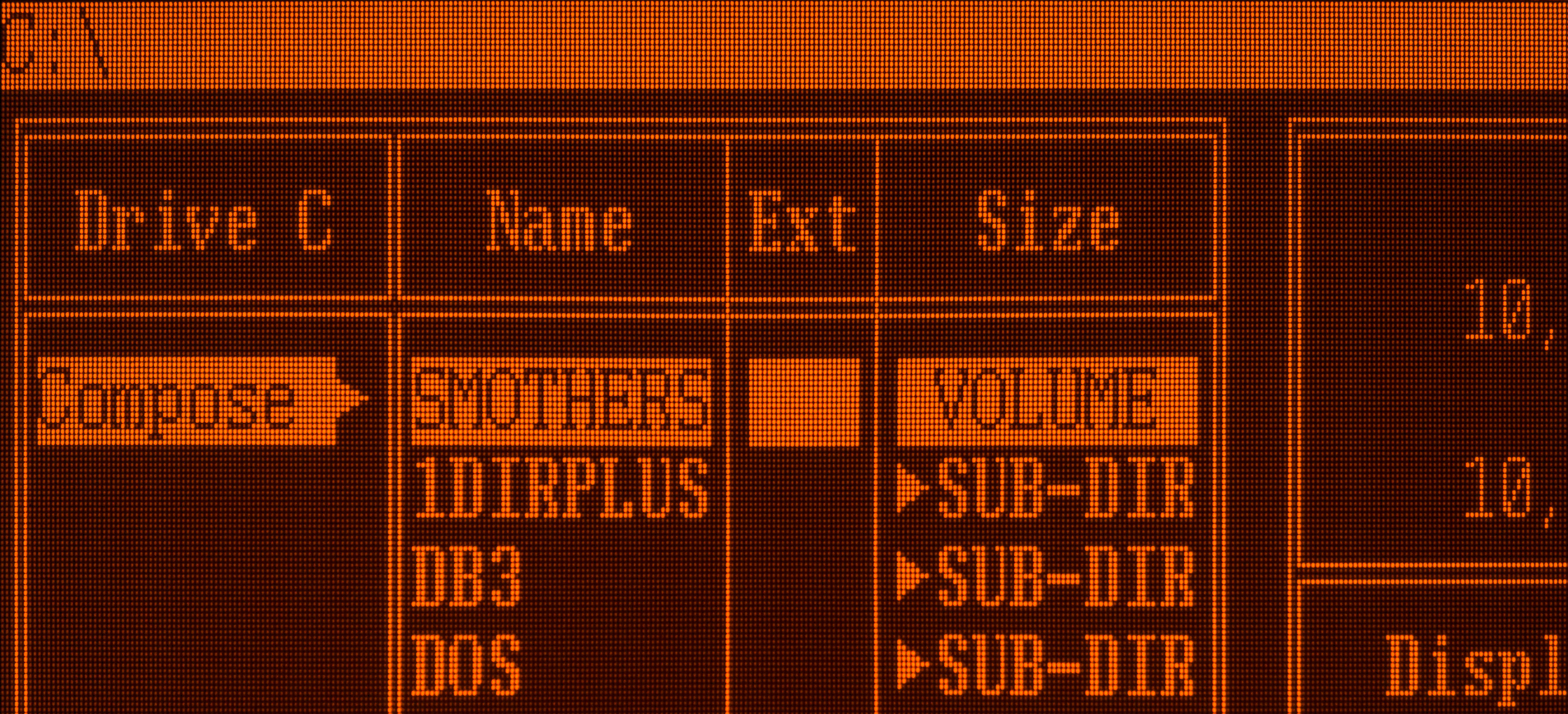
Toshiba T3100 plasma screen close-up

In 1983, IBM introduced a 19-inch (48 cm) orange-on-black monochrome display (Model 3290 Information Panel) which was able to show up to four simultaneous IBM 3270 terminal sessions. By the end of the decade, orange monochrome plasma displays were used in a number of high-end AC-powered portable computers, such as the Ericsson Portable PC (the first use of such a display in 1985), the Compaq Portable 386 (1987) and the IBM P75 (1990). Plasma displays had a better contrast ratio, viewability angle, and faster response time than the LCDs that were available at the time, and were used until the introduction of active-matrix color LCD displays in 1992.

Due to heavy competition from monochrome LCDs used in laptops and the high costs of plasma display technology, in 1987 IBM planned to shut down its factory in Kingston, New York, the largest plasma plant in the world, in favor of manufacturing mainframe computers, which would have left development to Japanese companies. Dr. Larry F. Weber, a University of Illinois ECE PhD (in plasma display research) and staff scientist working at CERL (home of the PLATO System), co-founded Plasmaco with Stephen Globus and IBM plant manager James Kehoe, and bought the plant from IBM for US$50,000. Weber stayed in Urbana as CTO until 1990, then moved to upstate New York to work at Plasmaco.

=== 1990s ===
In 1992, Fujitsu introduced the world's first 21-inch (53 cm) full-color display. It was based on technology created at the University of Illinois at Urbana–Champaign and NHK Science & Technology Research Laboratories.

In 1994, Weber demonstrated a color plasma display at an industry convention in San Jose. Panasonic Corporation began a joint development project with Plasmaco, which led in 1996 to the purchase of Plasmaco, its color AC technology, and its American factory for US$26 million.

In 1995, Fujitsu introduced the first 42-inch (107 cm) plasma display panel; it had 852×480 resolution and was progressively scanned. Two years later, at the Customer Electronics Show 1997 and CeBIT, Philips introduced the first large commercially available flat-panel TV, using the Fujitsu panels. Philips had plans to sell it for 70,000 french francs. It was released as the Philips 42PW9962, and available at four Sears locations in the United States, for the price of $14,999, including in-home installation. Pioneer and Fujitsu also began selling plasma televisions that year, and other manufacturers followed. By the year 2000 prices had dropped to $10,000.

=== 2000s ===
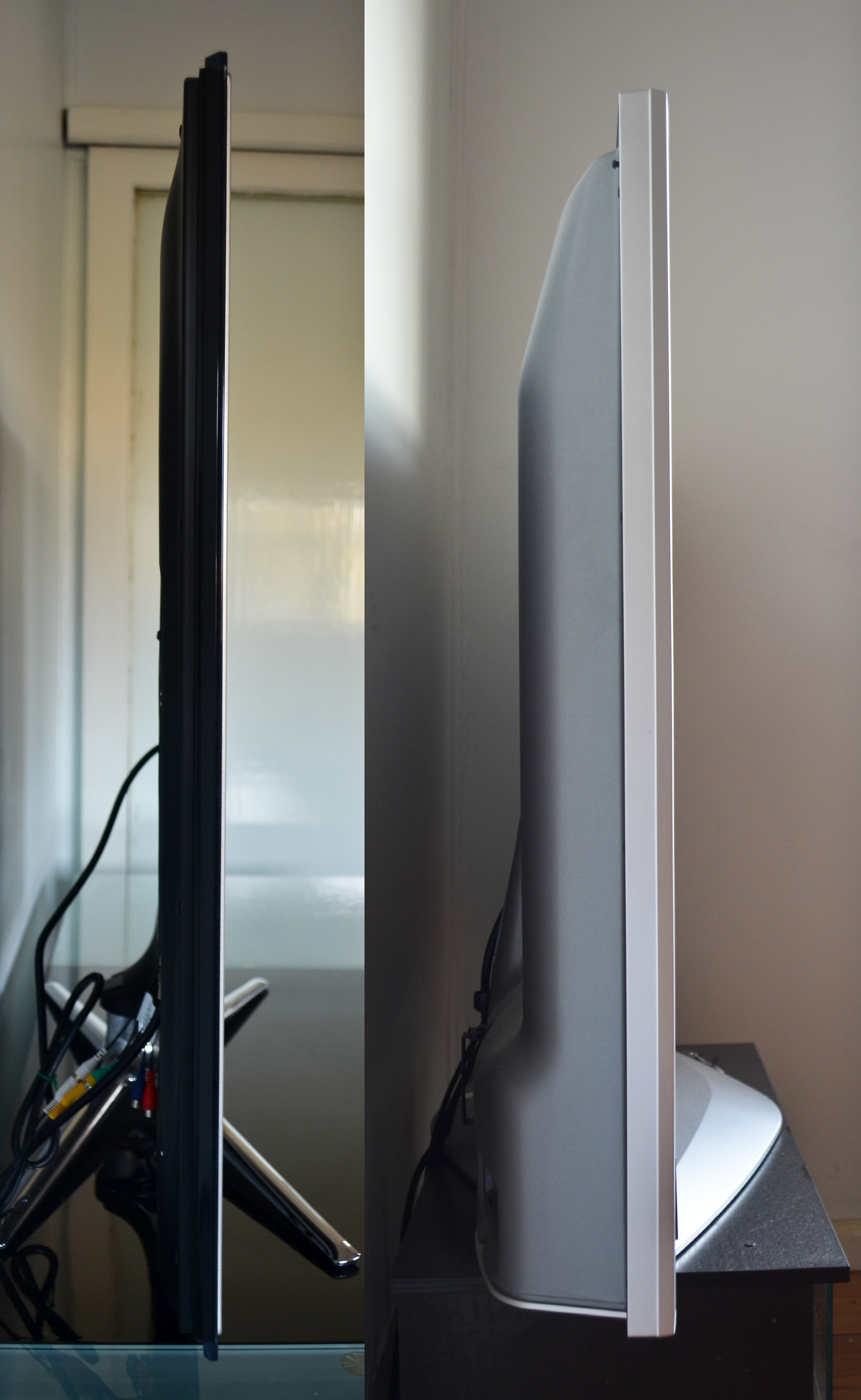
Plasma displays became 75% thinner between 2006 and 2011.

In the year 2000, the first 60-inch (152-cm) plasma display was developed by Plasmaco. Panasonic was also reported to have developed a process to make plasma displays using ordinary window glass instead of the much more expensive "high strain point" glass. High strain point glass is made similarly to conventional float glass, but it is more heat resistant, deforming at higher temperatures. High strain point glass is normally necessary because plasma displays have to be baked during manufacture to dry the rare-earth phosphors after they are applied to the display. However, high strain point glass may be less scratch resistant.

Until the early 2000s, plasma displays were the most popular choice for HDTV flat-panel display as they had many benefits over LCDs. Beyond plasma's deeper blacks, increased contrast, faster response time, greater color spectrum, and wider viewing angle; they were also much bigger than LCDs, and it was believed that LCDs were suited only to smaller sized televisions. Plasma had overtaken rear-projection systems in 2005.

However, improvements in LCD fabrication narrowed the technological gap. The increased size, lower weight, falling prices, and often lower electrical power consumption of LCDs made them competitive with plasma television sets. In 2006, LCD prices started to fall rapidly and their screen sizes increased, although plasma televisions maintained a slight edge in picture quality and a price advantage for sets at the critical 42" size and larger. By late 2006, several vendors were offering 42" LCDs, albeit at a premium price, encroaching upon plasma's only stronghold. More decisively, LCDs offered higher resolutions and 1080p support before plasma.

In late 2006, analysts noted that LCDs had overtaken plasmas, particularly in the 40-inch (100 cm) and above segment where plasma had previously gained market share. Another industry trend was the consolidation of plasma display manufacturers, with around 50 brands available but only five manufacturers. In the first quarter of 2008, a comparison of worldwide TV sales broke down to 22.1 million for direct-view CRT, 21.1 million for LCD, 2.8 million for plasma, and 0.1 million for rear projection.

When the sales figures for the 2007 Christmas season were finally tallied, analysts were surprised to find that not only had LCD outsold plasma, but CRTs as well, during the same period. This development drove competing large-screen systems from the market almost overnight. The February 2009 announcement that Pioneer Electronics was ending production of plasma screens was widely considered the tipping point in the technology's history as well.

Screen sizes have increased since the introduction of plasma displays. The largest plasma video display in the world at the 2008 Consumer Electronics Show in Las Vegas, Nevada, was a 150-inch (380 cm) unit manufactured by Matsushita Electric Industrial (Panasonic) standing 6 ft (180 cm) tall by 11 ft (340 cm) wide.

=== 2010s ===
At the 2010 Consumer Electronics Show in Las Vegas, Panasonic introduced their 152" 2160p 3D plasma. In 2010, Panasonic shipped 19.1 million plasma TV panels.

In 2010, the shipments of plasma TVs reached 18.2 million units globally. Since that time, shipments of plasma TVs have declined substantially. This decline has been attributed to the competition from liquid crystal (LCD) televisions, whose prices have fallen more rapidly than those of the plasma TVs. In late 2013, Panasonic announced that they would stop producing plasma TVs from March 2014 onwards. In 2014, LG and Samsung discontinued plasma TV production as well, effectively killing the technology, probably because of declining demand.

== Design ==
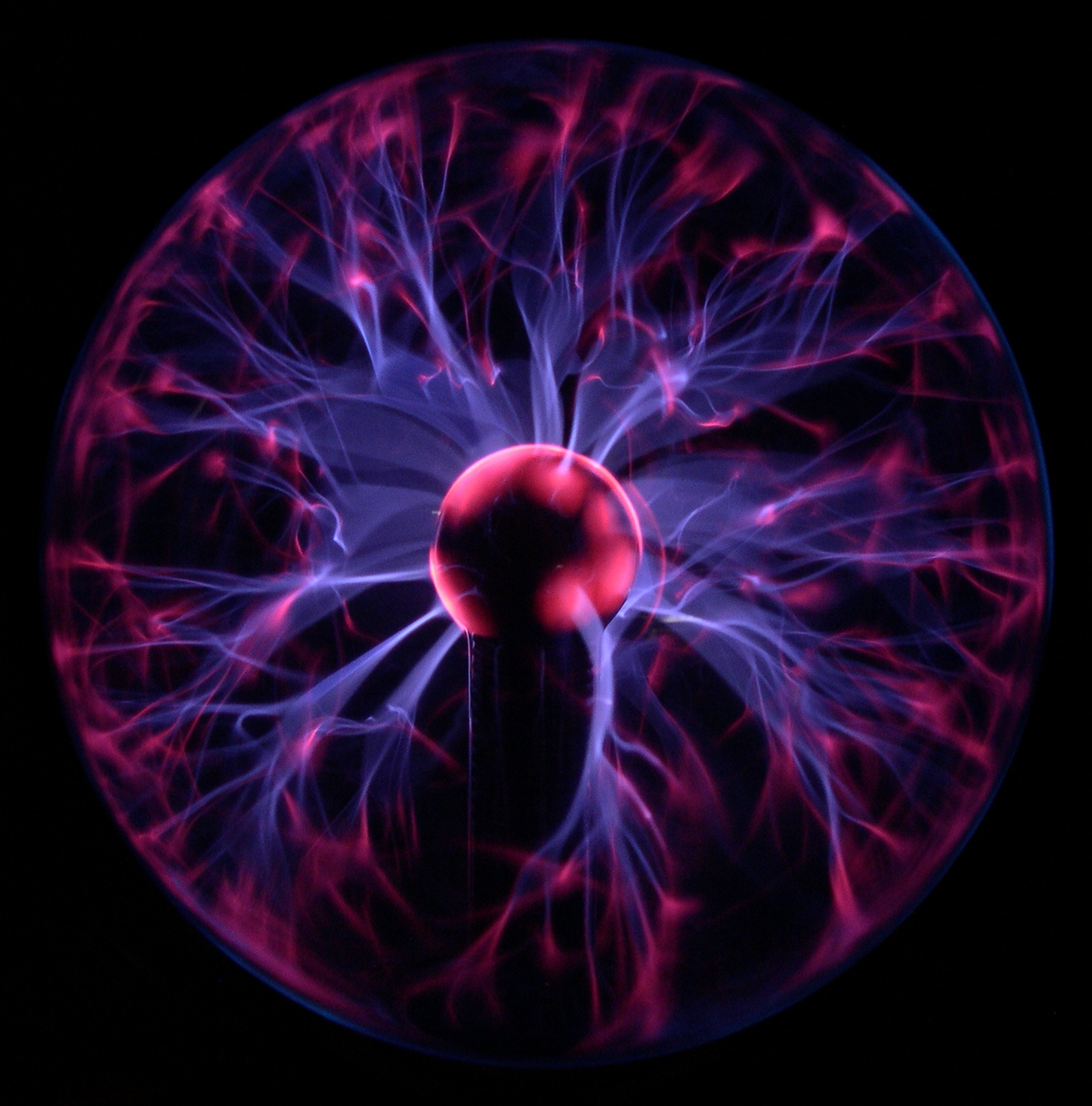
Ionized gases such as the ones shown here are confined to millions of tiny individual compartments across the face of a plasma display, to collectively form a visual image.

Composition of plasma display panel

A panel of a plasma display typically comprises millions of tiny compartments in between two panels of glass. These compartments, or "bulbs" or "cells", hold a mixture of noble gases and a minuscule amount of another gas (e.g., mercury vapor). Just as in the fluorescent lamps over an office desk, when a high voltage is applied across the cell, the gas in the cells forms a plasma. With flow of electricity (electrons), some of the electrons strike mercury particles as the electrons move through the plasma, momentarily increasing the energy level of the atom until the excess energy is shed. Mercury sheds the energy as ultraviolet (UV) photons. The UV photons then strike phosphor that is painted on the inside of the cell. When the UV photon strikes a phosphor molecule, it momentarily raises the energy level of an outer orbit electron in the phosphor molecule, moving the electron from a stable to an unstable state; the electron then sheds the excess energy as a photon at a lower energy level than UV light; the lower energy photons are mostly in the infrared range but about 40% are in the visible light range. Thus the input energy is converted to mostly infrared but also as visible light. The screen heats up to between 30 and 41 °C (86 and 106 °F) during operation. Depending on the phosphors used, different colors of visible light can be achieved. Each pixel in a plasma display is made up of three cells comprising the primary colors of visible light. Varying the voltage of the signals to the cells thus allows different perceived colors.

The long electrodes are stripes of electrically conducting material that also lies between the glass plates in front of and behind the cells. The "address electrodes" sit behind the cells, along the rear glass plate, and can be opaque. The transparent display bus electrodes are mounted in front of the cell, along the front glass plate. As can be seen in the illustration, the electrodes are covered by an insulating protective layer. A magnesium oxide layer may be present to protect the dielectric layer and to emit secondary electrons.

Control circuitry charges the electrodes that cross paths at a cell, creating a voltage difference between front and back. Some of the atoms in the gas of a cell then lose electrons and become ionized, which creates an electrically conducting plasma of atoms, free electrons, and ions. The collisions of the flowing electrons in the plasma with the inert gas atoms leads to light emission; such light-emitting plasmas are known as glow discharges.

Relative spectral power of red, green and blue phosphors of a common plasma display. The units of spectral power are simply raw sensor values (with a linear response at specific wavelengths).

In a monochrome plasma panel, the gas is mostly neon, and the color is the characteristic orange of a neon-filled lamp (or sign). Once a glow discharge has been initiated in a cell, it can be maintained by applying a low-level voltage between all the horizontal and vertical electrodes–even after the ionizing voltage is removed. To erase a cell all voltage is removed from a pair of electrodes. This type of panel has inherent memory. A small amount of nitrogen is added to the neon to increase hysteresis and thus help with the memory effect. Plasma panels may be built without nitrogen gas, using xenon, neon, argon, and helium instead with mercury being used in some early displays. In color panels, the back of each cell is coated with a phosphor. The ultraviolet photons emitted by the plasma excite these phosphors, which give off visible light with colors determined by the phosphor materials. This aspect is comparable to fluorescent lamps and to the neon signs that use colored phosphors. Color panels use xenon and neon.

Every pixel is made up of three separate subpixel cells, each with different colored phosphors. One subpixel has a red light phosphor, one subpixel has a green light phosphor and one subpixel has a blue light phosphor. These colors blend together to create the overall color of the pixel, the same as a triad of a shadow mask CRT or color LCD. Plasma panels use pulse-width modulation (PWM) to control brightness: by varying the pulses of current flowing through the different cells thousands of times per second, the control system can increase or decrease the intensity of each subpixel color to create billions of different combinations of red, green and blue. In this way, the control system can produce most of the visible colors. Plasma displays use the same phosphors as CRTs, which accounts for the extremely accurate color reproduction when viewing television or computer video images (which use an RGB color system designed for CRT displays). The cells are made of trench-like structures whose walls are called ribs. The trenches are shared among all cells vertically, and then each cell is defined by each intersection between the address and bus electrode. The phosphors cover the entire inner surface of each trench and are applied via a spraying process where a mask 0.15 mm thick made of invar, similar to the one used in a CRT display is used to block undesired areas for each color: red, green and blue. The cells can also be isolated vertically in a waffle rib structure. The bus electrodes are made of silver applied during manufacturing as a paste and can contain black stripes for preventing color bleed between pixels. The rib can be made of a glass frit paste that used to contain lead oxide for a low melting point, but can also be lead free with barium, beryllium, strontium, silicon and/or zinc oxides. The glass frit is applied then baked to its melting point and cooled to solidify it. Several plasma displays are made simultaneously in a multi panel process where several displays are made on a single mother glass, then cut. This allows for higher production efficiency. The electrodes on both sides of the display are covered directly in a glass frit dielectric layer to modify plasma discharge characteristics, such as limiting discharge current. The glass frit is often applied using screen printing in layers that then are sintered by melting, but other methods can be used. For example the ribs can be patterned using photolithography using so called green sheets of dried glass paste film, which are sensitive to light. Then it passes through photolithography and development to remove excess material leaving the ribs, which are then sintered. More commonly, a sandblast method is used. The glass is laminated with dry photoresist film, which is then exposed to uv light, which weakens areas. Then these areas are removed with sandblasting and the remaining material is sintered. The silver paste can also be applied using screen printing or as a sheet that is laminated, then patterned with photolithography. The MgO layer for the transparent electrodes is on top of the dielectric layer and is deposited via electron beam evaporation. The edges of the display are sealed using glass frit paste.

To produce light, the cells need to be driven at a relatively high voltage (~300 volts) and the pressure of the gases inside the cell needs to be low (~500 torr).

Plasma displays have a wide color gamut and can be produced in fairly large sizes—up to 3.8 metres (150 in) diagonally. They had a very low luminance "dark-room" black level compared with the lighter grey of the unilluminated parts of an LCD screen. (As plasma panels are locally lit and do not require a back light, blacks are blacker on plasma and grayer on LCDs.) LED-backlit LCD televisions have been developed to reduce this distinction. The display panel itself is about 6 cm (2.4 in) thick, generally allowing the device's total thickness (including electronics) to be less than 10 cm (3.9 in). Power consumption varies greatly with picture content, with bright scenes drawing significantly more power than darker ones – this is also true for CRTs as well as modern LCDs where LED backlight brightness is adjusted dynamically. The plasma that illuminates the screen can reach a temperature of at least 1,200 °C (2,190 °F). Typical power consumption is 400 watts for a 127 cm (50 in) screen. Most screens are set to "vivid" mode by default in the factory (which maximizes the brightness and raises the contrast so the image on the screen looks good under the extremely bright lights that are common in big box stores), which draws at least twice the power (around 500–700 watts) of a "home" setting of less extreme brightness. The lifetime of the latest generation of plasma displays is estimated at 100,000 hours (11 years) of actual display time, or 27 years at 10 hours per day. This is the estimated time over which maximum picture brightness degrades to half the original value.

Plasma screens are made out of glass, which may result in glare on the screen from nearby light sources. Plasma display panels cannot be economically manufactured in screen sizes smaller than 81 centimetres (32 in). Although a few companies have been able to make plasma enhanced-definition televisions (EDTV) this small, even fewer have made 32-inch (81-cm) plasma HDTVs. With the trend toward large-screen television technology, the 32-inch (81-cm) screen size was rapidly disappearing by mid-2009. Though considered bulky and thick compared with their LCD counterparts, some sets such as Panasonic's Z1 and Samsung's B860 series are as slim as 2.5 cm (1 in) thick making them comparable to LCDs in this respect. Plasma displays are generally heavier than LCD and may require more careful handling, such as being kept upright.

Plasma displays use more electrical power, on average, than an LCD TV using a LED backlight. Older CCFL backlights for LCD panels used quite a bit more power, and older plasma TVs used quite a bit more power than more recent models.

Plasma displays do not work as well at high altitudes above 6,500 feet (2,000 meters) due to pressure differential between the gases inside the screen and the air pressure at altitude. It may cause a buzzing noise. Manufacturers rate their screens to indicate the altitude parameters.

For those who wish to listen to AM radio, or are amateur radio operators (hams) or shortwave listeners (SWL), the radio frequency interference (RFI) from these devices can be irritating or disabling.

In their heyday, they were less expensive for the buyer per square inch than LCD, particularly when considering equivalent performance.

Plasma displays have wider viewing angles than those of LCD; images do not suffer from degradation at less than straight ahead angles like LCDs. LCDs using IPS technology have the widest angles, but they do not equal the range of plasma primarily due to "IPS glow", a generally whitish haze that appears due to the nature of the IPS pixel design.

Plasma displays have less visible motion blur, thanks in large part to very high refresh rates and a faster response time, contributing to superior performance when displaying content with significant amounts of rapid motion such as auto racing, hockey, baseball, etc.

Plasma displays have superior uniformity to LCD panel backlights, which nearly always produce uneven brightness levels, although this is not always noticeable. High-end computer monitors have technologies to try to compensate for the uniformity problem.

=== Contrast ratio ===
Contrast ratio is the difference between the brightest and darkest parts of an image, measured in discrete steps, at any given moment. Generally, the higher the contrast ratio, the more realistic the image is (though the "realism" of an image depends on many factors including color accuracy, luminance linearity, and spatial linearity). Contrast ratios for plasma displays are often advertised as high as 5,000,000:1. On the surface, this is a significant advantage of plasma over most other current display technologies, a notable exception being organic light-emitting diode. Although there are no industry-wide guidelines for reporting contrast ratio, most manufacturers follow either the ANSI standard or perform a full-on-full-off test. The ANSI standard uses a checkered test pattern whereby the darkest blacks and the lightest whites are simultaneously measured, yielding the most accurate "real-world" ratings. In contrast, a full-on-full-off test measures the ratio using a pure black screen and a pure white screen, which gives higher values but does not represent a typical viewing scenario. Some displays, using many different technologies, have some "leakage" of light, through either optical or electronic means, from lit pixels to adjacent pixels so that dark pixels that are near bright ones appear less dark than they do during a full-off display. Manufacturers can further artificially improve the reported contrast ratio by increasing the contrast and brightness settings to achieve the highest test values. However, a contrast ratio generated by this method is misleading, as content would be essentially unwatchable at such settings.

Each cell on a plasma display must be precharged before it is lit, otherwise the cell would not respond quickly enough. Precharging normally increases power consumption, so energy recovery mechanisms may be in place to avoid an increase in power consumption. This precharging means the cells cannot achieve a true black, whereas an LED backlit LCD panel can actually turn off parts of the backlight, in "spots" or "patches" (this technique, however, does not prevent the large accumulated passive light of adjacent lamps, and the reflection media, from returning values from within the panel). Some manufacturers have reduced the precharge and the associated background glow, to the point where black levels on modern plasmas are starting to become close to some high-end CRTs Sony and Mitsubishi produced ten years before the comparable plasma displays. With an LCD, black pixels are generated by a light polarization method; many panels are unable to completely block the underlying backlight. More recent LCD panels using LED illumination can automatically reduce the backlighting on darker scenes, though this method cannot be used in high-contrast scenes, leaving some light showing from black parts of an image with bright parts, such as (at the extreme) a solid black screen with one fine intense bright line. This is called a "halo" effect which has been minimized on newer LED-backlit LCDs with local dimming. Edgelit models cannot compete with this as the light is reflected via a light guide to distribute the light behind the panel.

Plasma displays are capable of producing deeper blacks than LCD allowing for a superior contrast ratio.

Earlier generation displays (circa 2006 and prior) had phosphors that lost luminosity over time, resulting in gradual decline of absolute image brightness. Newer models have advertised lifespans exceeding 100,000 hours (11 years), far longer than older CRTs.

=== Screen burn-in ===
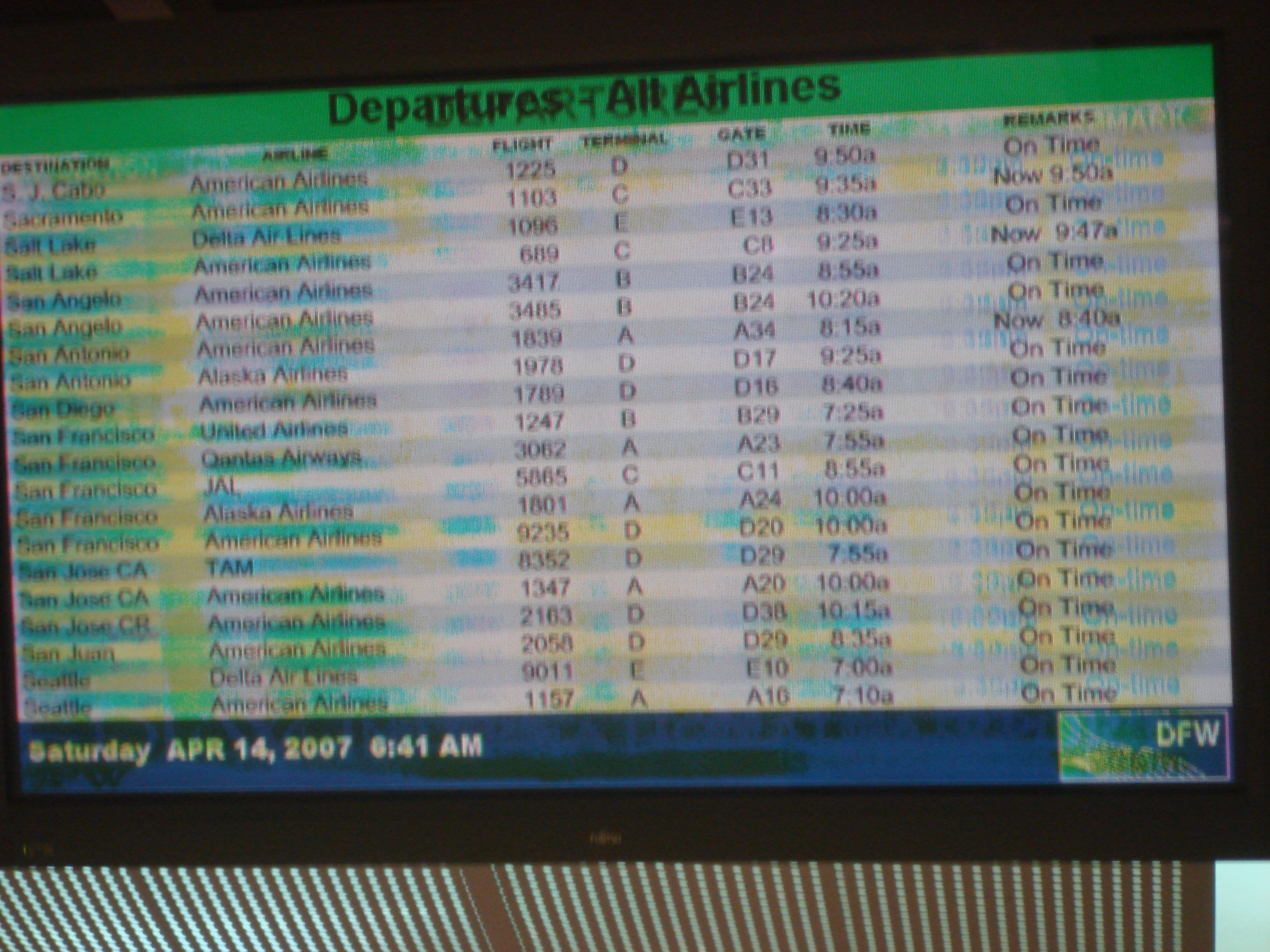
An example of a plasma display that has suffered severe burn-in from static text

Image burn-in occurs on CRTs and plasma panels when the same picture is displayed for long periods. This causes the phosphors to overheat, losing some of their luminosity and producing a "shadow" image that is visible with the power off. Burn-in is especially a problem on plasma panels because they run hotter than CRTs. Early plasma televisions were plagued by burn-in, making it impossible to use video games or anything else that displayed static images.

Plasma displays also exhibit another image retention issue which is sometimes confused with screen burn-in damage. In this mode, when a group of pixels are run at high brightness (when displaying white, for example) for an extended period, a charge build-up in the pixel structure occurs and a ghost image can be seen. However, unlike burn-in, this charge build-up is transient and self-corrects after the image condition that caused the effect has been removed and a long enough period has passed (with the display either off or on).

Plasma manufacturers have tried various ways of reducing burn-in such as using gray pillarboxes, pixel orbiters and image washing routines. Recent models have a pixel orbiter that moves the entire picture slower than is noticeable to the human eye, which reduces the effect of burn-in but does not prevent it. None to date have eliminated the problem and all plasma manufacturers continue to exclude burn-in from their warranties.

=== Screen resolution ===
Fixed-pixel displays such as plasma TVs scale the video image of each incoming signal to the native resolution of the display panel. The most common native resolutions for plasma display panels are 852×480 (EDTV), 1,366×768 and 1920×1080 (HDTV). As a result, picture quality varies depending on the performance of the video scaling processor and the upscaling and downscaling algorithms used by each display manufacturer.

Early plasma televisions were enhanced-definition (ED) with a native resolution of 840×480 (discontinued) or 852×480 and down-scaled their incoming high-definition video signals to match their native display resolutions.

The following ED resolutions were common prior to the introduction of HD displays, but have long been phased out in favor of HD displays, as well as because the overall pixel count in ED displays is lower than the pixel count on SD PAL displays (852×480 vs 720×576, respectively).

- 840×480p
- 852×480p

Early high-definition (HD) plasma displays had a resolution of 1024x1024 and were alternate lighting of surfaces (ALiS) panels made by Fujitsu and Hitachi. These were interlaced displays, with non-square pixels.

Later HDTV plasma televisions usually have a resolution of 1,024×768 found on many 42-inch (107-cm) plasma screens, 1280×768 and 1,366×768 found on 50 in, 60 in, and 65 in plasma screens, or 1920×1080 found on plasma screen sizes from 42 to 103 inches (107–262 cm). These displays are usually progressive displays, with non-square pixels, and will up-scale and de-interlace their incoming standard-definition signals to match their native display resolutions. 1024×768 resolution requires that 720p content be downscaled in one direction and upscaled in the other.

== Notable manufacturers ==
- Changhong (produced panels)
- Fujitsu (only produced panels)
- Chunghwa Picture Tubes (only produced panels)
- Formosa plastics (only produced panels)
- Hitachi (produced panels)
- LG (produced panels)
- Panasonic Viera (produced panels)
- Pioneer (produced panels)
- Samsung (produced panels)
- Toshiba (produced panels)

== Environmental impact ==
Plasma screens use significantly more energy than CRT and LCD screens.

== See also ==
- History of display technology
- Plasmatron
- Large-screen television technology – Technology rapidly developed in the late 1990s and 2000s
- Comparison of CRT, LCD, plasma, and OLED displays
