= List of Danish online encyclopedic resources =

This is a list of online encyclopedic resources from Denmark, mostly in Danish, which can be freely accessed on the internet.

== General purpose ==
- Den Store Danske Encyklopædi, a general purpose encyclopedia from the Gyldendal publishing house.
- Salmonsens Konversationsleksikon, a general purpose encyclopedia published between 1915 and 1930. Project Runeberg hosts an online copy.

== Biography ==
- Dansk biografisk leksikon, a large collection of Danish biographies. The first edition (1887-1905) from Project Runeberg is available online. Searchable online access to the current version containing updated articles, is available from Gyldendal's Den Store Danske website.
- Dansk kvindebiografisk leksikon (Danish Women's Biographical Encyclopedia), Jytte Larsen (ed), Volumes 1-4. Rosinante, 2000-01. The searchable online edition contains over 1,900 biographies from the Middle Ages to the present.
- Kendtes Gravsted, a collection of over 3,600 short descriptions of famous people, mainly Danes, buried in Danish cemeteries.

== Culture ==
- Kunstindeks Danmark & Weilbachs Kunstnerleksikon, providing information on Danish artists and Danish and foreign artworks in Danish museums. There is also an English-language search page but the articles themselves are in Danish.
- Project Runeberg, digitising the full texts of Nordic books of historic, literary or cultural interest, with online access.

== Architecture ==
- Dansk Architektur Center, online information about Danish architecture, architects and history of architecture.
- Danske Kirker (Danish Churches), freely searchable database from National Museum of Denmark providing extensive details of about two thirds of Denmark's churches. Contains articles from 57 volumes published between 1933 and the present covering different regions of Denmark (over 37,000 pages).
- Selskabet for Københavns Historie, online version of Jens Fleischer's København. Kulturhistorisk opslagsbog med turforslag giving detailed descriptions of many of Copenhagen's historic buildings, streets and parks.

== Library resources ==
- REX, the online database of the Royal Danish Library provides access to catalogues and digital resources including paintings and photographs. Some facilities are restricted by login (for Danish citizens only).
- Bibliotek.dk, providing access to the titles of books throughout the Danish public library system, sometimes with short descriptions.

== See also ==
- List of online encyclopedias
