= Comparison of CRT, LCD, plasma, and OLED displays =

The following table compares cathode-ray tube (CRT), liquid-crystal display (LCD), plasma and organic light-emitting diode (OLED) display device technologies. These are the most often used technologies for television and computer displays (Though as of 2025 only LCD, LED, and OLED displays are generally widely available). A less detailed comparison of a wider variety of display technologies is available at Comparison of display technology.

Technology Parameter	CRT	LCD	Plasma	OLED
Static contrast ratio	Finite or infinite	150 to 8100:1.	Typically 1000 to 3000:1, Some models measured up to 20,333:1.	Sony claims an OLED contrast range of 1,000,000:1.
Peak luminosity	Dependent on the anode voltage and area of the scanning region.	Dependent on the backlight and not the panel, typically 200–4000 cd/m2	50–200 cd/m2	100–1500 cd/m2 often significantly varying based on average picture level.
Color depth	Unlimited gradations between colors due to being an analog technology.	6 to 10 -bit per subpixel panels; smaller dot pitch, better detail.	6 to 8 -bit per subpixel panels	8 to 12 -bit per subpixel.
Response time	Less than 1 to 10 μs, but limited by phosphor decay time (around 5 ms).	1–8 ms typical (according to manufacturer data), older units could be as slow as 35 ms	Typically 2 to 10 μs, but limited by phosphor decay time (around 5 ms).	Estimates varying from 1 to 10 μs.
Frame rate (refresh rate)	60 to 85 Hz typically, some up to 200 Hz at reduced resolution, but not faster than input frame rate.).	60 Hz typically, up to 540 Hz for some gaming monitors.	60 to 120 Hz, internally refreshed at 480 or 600 Hz.	60 Hz typically. Up to 480 Hz.
Flicker	Perceptible on lower refresh rates (60 Hz and below)	Older (earlier than 2013) LCDs used PWM (strobing) to dim the backlight. However, since then, many flicker-free LCD computer monitors have been introduced. As of 2016, TFTCentral retired its "flicker free monitor database" as most monitors introduced are advertised as being flicker free.	Does not normally occur due to a high refresh rate higher than FPS.	Does not normally occur at 100% brightness level. At levels below 100% flicker often occurs with frequencies between 60 and 255 Hz, since often pulse-width modulation is used to dim OLED screens. (See DC dimming)
Risk of image persistence or burn-in	High	Low	High	High
Energy consumption and heat generation	High	Low	Usually higher than LCD	OLED displays use 40% of the power of an LCD displaying an image that is primarily black as they lack the need for a backlight, while OLED can use more than three times as much power to display a mostly white image compared to an LCD.
Environmental influences	Sensitive to ambient magnetic fields, which can adversely affect convergence and color purity.	Prone to malfunctions on both low (below −4 °F, −20 °C) or high (above 113 °F, 45 °C) temperatures.	High altitude pressure difference may cause poor function or buzzing noises.	Can have poor brightness, especially when most of the picture is white
Electro-magnetic radiation emission	Can emit a small amount of X-ray radiation.	Only emits non-ionizing radiation.	Emits strong radio frequency electromagnetic radiation.	None, although control circuitry may emit radio interference
Size	Up to 43 in (110 cm).	Up to 120 in (3.0 m).	Up to 150 in (3.8 m). (152 in (3.9 m) experimental)	Up to 97 in (2.5 m)
Maintenance	Hazardous to repair or service due to high-voltage, requires skilled convergence calibration and adjustments for geographic location changes. Glass display tube is evacuated and carries risk of implosion if improperly handled.	May be risky and expensive to repair due to complexity of the display; units with mercury CCFL backlight lamps are an environmental health hazard.	Screen itself cannot be repaired if the gas used to generate images leaks.	Display itself cannot be repaired if it cracks and oxygen enters it due to failure of OLED encapsulation, which results in display failure.
Other	No native resolution. Currently, the only display technology capable of multi-syncing (displaying different resolutions and refresh rates without the need for scaling). Display lag is extremely low due to its nature, which does not need to store image data before output, unlike LCDs, plasma displays and OLED displays. Extremely bulky and heavy construction in comparison to other display technologies. No longer produced.	The LCD grid can mask effects of spatial and grayscale quantization, creating the illusion of higher image quality. It is the cheapest display technology currently produced, with some entry-level models selling for less than $100.	Screen-door effects are more noticeable than LCD when up close, or on larger sizes. New models are no longer produced.	Colored sub-pixels may age at different rates, leading to a color shift, although some models will scan pixels to even out wear and prevent this shift. Sensitive to UV light from direct sunlight. Is considered the highest quality but also the most expensive display technology currently produced, with TVs being available for $600.
