= Elfwood =

Online fantasy and SciFi art community

- Website type: Artistic community
- Dissolved: 2016; 10 years ago
- Owner: Usify AB
- Creator: Thomas F Abrahamsson
- Commercial: Mixed
- Registration: Yes
- Launched: May 1, 1996; 30 years ago
- Current status: Defunct

Elfwood was a web-based alternative art gallery and online community devoted to original science fiction and fantasy art and writing. It was started 1 May 1996 by Thomas Abrahamsson and claimed to be the largest science fiction and fantasy art site in the world. It was most popular in the Americas and Europe. Gradually overwhelmed by its competitor DeviantArt, Elfwood was eventually shut down in 2016.

== History ==
=== Early years ===
Elfwood was founded on May 1, 1996, by Thomas Abrahamsson, heavily inspired by Massimilianno Bertuzzi and Robert Orta, under the name of the "Lothlorien" project, and was aimed at amateur high-fantasy artists. The site was hosted as a non-profit maintained by the academic computer club Lysator of Linköping University in Sweden, and run on the Roxen Software. At the time, its gallery consisted of three artists (including Abrahamsson), and all submissions and updates to the site were managed directly by Abrahamsson, with the individual users e-mailing Abrahamsson with their requested submissions or changes.

Abrahamsson stated his original intentions with the website could be described as the following:

"There are three major ideas behind this site: Showing pieces of art from the wonderful world of fantasy to the general public, letting all amateur fantasy artists show their work for free, helping them to get a name and reputation, and helping other artists with inspiration by giving a chance to look at fellow artists' art."

As the Lothlorien membership and gallery expanded, Abrahamsson developed the site's extranet in August 1997, allowing Elfwood members to manage their own individual art galleries and account information directly, without requiring webmaster assistance.

After a while, "Zone 47" was created for science fiction and modern fantasy art, and two years later the "Wyvern's Library" was created for written science fiction and fantasy submissions. This expanded to include how-to guides and full range motifs. A few months later, FARP (Fantasy Art Resource Project) was created and their email list, WoodChat was designed.

In April 2000 the ERB (Elfwood Review Board) was founded. It was responsible for maintaining the rules on Elfwood.

=== Moderation ===
Originally, Elfwood was moderated by a small group of five, which included Thomas F. Abrahmsson as the founder, Mirar, as a software maintenance technician, Henrik 'Hedda' Wallin as the systems engineer, Eliza M. Leahy as a recruitment co-ordinator for West Coast America, and Peter 'ZinO' Bortas as an applications administrator and moderator, along with the Elfwood Review Board.

By Early 2003, their team had grown, adding in Eline 'Ellende' Spek, who became a moderation training assistant and media manager, as well as a core group of volunteer moderators.

=== Temporary closing ===
In June 2001, Elfwood was closed due to death threats after a man with the alias "Assassin" threatened to throw gasoline on the ERB crew and burn them alive. The site reopened a month later. In July the FanQuarter area was opened. At the end of 2001 changes to Elfwood were put on hold so a more manageable system could be created. Elfwood was reopened in February 2002 with a new moderating system.

In January 2004 the sections known as Zone 47 and Lothlorien merged to create the current SF&F Art area. Along with the change came a new layout for the whole site, as well as revisions to the rules. In November of that year, Elfwood artist Paul Cameron Bennett was charged in League City, Texas for kidnapping a 14-year-old girl, Margaret “Katy” Catherine Wilkerson, whom he met through a chat-room linked through Elfwood.

Elfwood had a major crash, dubbed "the infamous April Fool's Day Elfwood crash," on the first of April in 2005. All data was lost and the last backup was from February. The site came back with a timewarp to February and the rules were again revised and rewritten. Archived copies of the Elfwood statistics counter from the Wayback Machine show 8000 fewer images and 200 fewer stories between the 1st and 10 April 2005.

=== Commercialization and afterwards ===
After 11 years as an amateur website, Elfwood was transformed into a commercial community in September 2007, adding new features for creating user profiles also for visiting users, tagging of favorite members and works and much more. Founder Thomas Abrahamsson said, "Cost for hosting and servers had become too high to handle as a hobby project." With this came the move of the servers from Linköping University. Before the move, Abrahamsson was frequently physically unable to access the servers to maintain the site due to their former location at the university grounds, which were locked down during the holidays.

In May 2009, Elfwood launched a completely revised set of simplified rules, accepting a much wider range of works and even out-of-genre items under a special 'Other Works' tab. The Extranet was taken down its functions fully transferred to the main site, replaced by a more user friendly upload interface and simpler moderation process.

Later on Elfwood's first Art Collaboration Club was born called "Bitfrost Fantasy", founded by Paula Fletcher. The name Bifrost was taken from Norse Mythology, being the sparkling rainbow bridge that connects Aesgard (land of the gods) and Midgard (land of mortals). Bifrost's goal was to "build a bridge" between fantasy artists and writers, from all over the world, in a creative and friendly atmosphere.

== Site content ==
Each piece was reviewed by moderators before being displayed in a gallery, and profanity and provocative language were not allowed. As of August 31, 2005 the rules were simplified, and in May 2009 they were further streamlined allowing also Non-Genre contents under a new "Other Works" tab. Members had to be 13 years or older to join with a real name.

=== Artistic Display Areas ===
Elfwood had three main display areas for creative work:

- SciFi & Fantasy Art is the main section (it was formerly divided in two sections, "Lothlorien" for high fantasy art and "Zone 47" for science fiction and modern/futuristic fantasy art).
- Wyvern's Library is for sci-fi and fantasy themed stories and poetry, including short stories as well as longer novels broken up by chapters.
- FanQuarter is devoted to fan art based on sci-fi or fantasy themed visual media such as video games, movies, animated cartoons or TV shows.

As of August 16, 2010, there were 941 separate galleries in SciFi & Fantasy Art and 148 galleries in FanQuarter.

==== Woodworks ====
The Elfwood ezine Woodworks was started in January 2002 by Georgette Tan, which featured articles, reviews, artwork and tutorials by Elfwood members. Tan later retired as Editor and Megan Larson took the position, leading Woodworks to its final issue in December 2004. It is now hosted in an inactive state at the main Elfwood site after the domain was finally shut down in late 2006.

== Statistics ==
In 2003, Elfwood had 6700 artists and 1300 writers. It logged 14500 sessions per day, each averaging 35 minutes in length. Sixty percent of the users were in the USA and most of the rest in Canada and Europe.

Date	Number of Members who Publish			Non-publishing Members	Total	Comments Written
Date	SciFi Fantasy (# of Images)	Fiction (# of Stories)	FanArt (# of Images)	Non-publishing Members	Total	Comments Written
2003	6700 artists and 1300 writers			-	-	-
5 Jun 2004	22417 (383239)	4822 (30947)	3508 (32467)	-	-	9183329^{¤}
1 Apr 2005^{◊}	24984 (434163)	5406 (34431)	3943 (37210)	-	-	11286593^{¤}
10 Apr 2005^{◊}	24523 (426700)	5338 (34228)	3879 (36668)	-	-	11002115^{¤}
Dec 2006	26285 (451312)	5771 (36182)	3836 (36740)	-	-	11002115^{¤}
May 2008	25867 (441332)	5773 (36055)	3595 (33830)	35451	70686	4014119
25 Feb 2009	25685 (434637)	5767 (35853)	3472 (32479)	48622	83345	4165282
20 August 2010	28841 (488826^{†})	6419 (37056)	3810 (-)	61580	100650	4134721
29 March 2011	29436 (494174^{†})	6463 (37296)	3843 (-)	66463	106205	4063941
29 April 2012	29393 (498269^{†})	6494 (37429)	3791 (-)	79735	119413	3984801
* Notes where data may have been left unchanged from previous recording in Wikipedia in error.^{◊} A major Elfwood server crash on the first of April in 2005 wiped out 2 months of data.^{¤} This number may include posts from Elftown before the project split from Elfwood. Also, it did not appear to change after mid April 2005 until late 2007.^{†} This number, from the ticker on the top right corner of the Elfwood site, may be counting SciFi Fantasy and FanArt together.

== Reception ==
Elfwood had been praised as an outlet for alternative beliefs. The community had been described as a "very interactive place where people are very supportive," in a quote from the San Jose Mercury News.

The FARP section of the site had been frequently recommended as a free resource for tutorials in a wide variety of creative topics. For example, TeachEngineering.org cited two of FARP's tutorials as "excellent guides" for figure drawing and writing about action, Figure Drawing: Basic Pose and Construction by William Li and Writing Action by S. B. "Kinko" Hulsey.
