= LYS-16 =

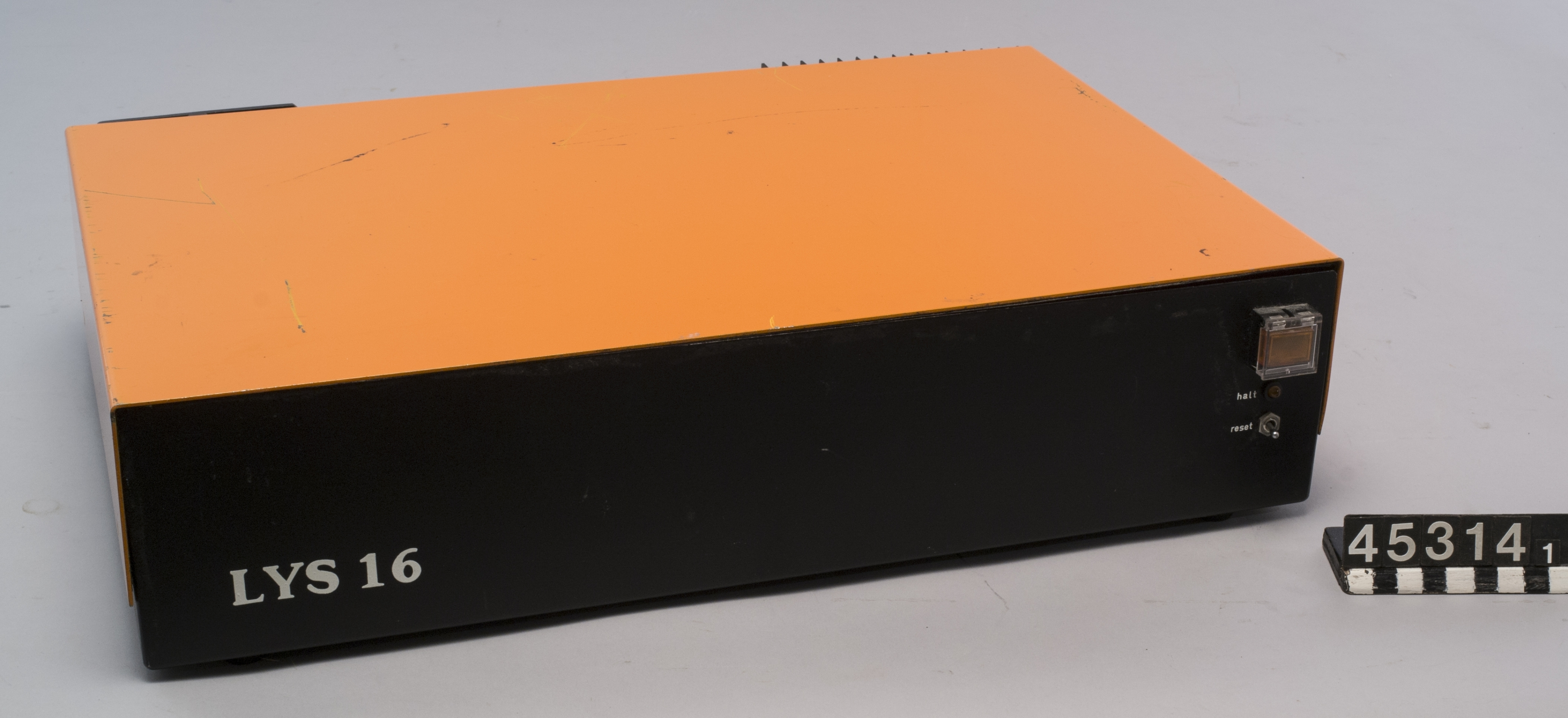
- Manufacturer: Lysator
- Released: April 1975; 51 years ago
- Discontinued: May 1978
- Units shipped: 1000
- CPU: IMP-16

LYS-16 was an early microcomputer based on the IMP-16 making it one of the first 16-bit microcomputers. It was designed and made by members of the Lysator academic computer club at Linköping University, Sweden

It was introduced in April 1975 and the first computers were delivered in December the same year. Two batches were made by Lysator before the production was handed over to ATEW in Flen who continued to produce it until May 1978. About 1000 units were made. For display it used an ordinary TV and for storage a tape recorder. A rudimentary operating system was available.

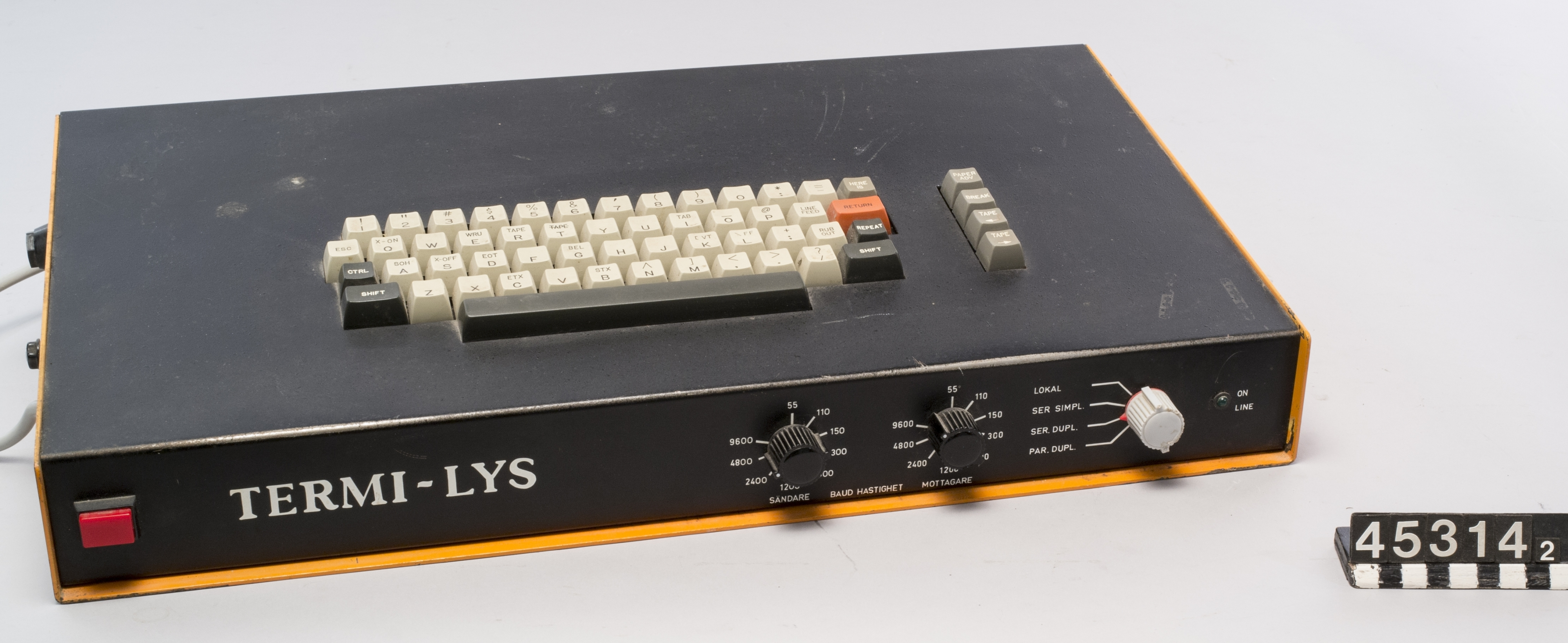
