= Donald Bitzer =

American electrical engineer and computer scientist (1934–2024)

- Born: Donald Lester Bitzer; January 1, 1934; East St. Louis, Illinois, U.S.
- Died: December 10, 2024 (aged 90); Cary, North Carolina, U.S.
- Occupations: Electrical engineer; computer scientist
- Spouse: Maryann Drost (m. 1955; died 2022)
- Children: 1
- Awards: See full list

Academic background
- Education: University of Illinois Urbana-Champaign (B.S.) (M.S.) (Ph.D.)

Academic work
- Sub-discipline: Computer science
- Institutions: North Carolina State University
- Notable works: PLATO, Plasma display

Donald Lester Bitzer (January 1, 1934 – December 10, 2024) was an American electrical engineer and computer scientist. He was the co-inventor of the plasma display and was widely regarded as the "father of PLATO".

== Life and career ==
Donald Lester Bitzer was born in East St. Louis, Illinois, on January 1, 1934. He grew up in Collinsville, Illinois. Bitzer received three degrees in electrical engineering (B.S., 1955; M.S., 1956; Ph.D., 1960) from the University of Illinois Urbana-Champaign.

Bitzer held several patents in numerous areas, while the PLATO computer system, the first system to combine graphics and touchscreens, is the most famous of his inventions.

Bitzer co-invented the flat plasma display panel in 1964.

In 1974, Bitzer was elected as a member into the National Academy of Engineering for "his leadership in the utilization and development of technology for improving the effectiveness of education".

From 1989, Bitzer was a Distinguished University Research Professor of Computer Science at North Carolina State University.

Bitzer was married to Maryann Drost, a nurse and educator, from 1955 until her death in 2022 and had a son, along with three grandchildren and two great-grandchildren. He died of congestive heart failure at home in Cary, North Carolina, on December 10, 2024, at the age of 90.

== Awards ==
In 1973, the National Academy of Engineering presented Bitzer with the Vladimir K. Zworykin Award, which honors the inventor of the iconoscope.

Bitzer was a designated National Associate, an honor which was granted to him by the National Academies in 2002. He was also a member of the American Society for Engineering Education.

- Member of the National Academy of Engineering (1974)
- Computer Society Fellow of the Institute of Electrical and Electronics Engineers (1982)
- Slottow Creativity Award (1989)
- Emmy Award (2002)
- Inducted into National Inventors Hall of Fame (2013)
- Fellow of the National Academy of Inventors (2018)
- Holladay Medal (2019)
- Fellow of the Computer History Museum (2022)
