= Roxen (web server) =

Free software web server

- Original author: Per Hedbor
- Developer: Roxen Internet Software AB
- Release: 1996; 30 years ago
- Stable release: 6.1.246-release5 / May 7, 2018; 8 years ago
- Written in: Pike
- Type: Web server
- License: GPL
- Website: download.roxen.com

Roxen is a free software web server produced by Roxen Internet Software, a company based in Linköping, Sweden and named after the nearby lake Roxen. It is released under the GNU General Public License. Roxen originally appeared as Spinner in the mid-1990s and is written in uLPC or Pike. During its heyday, Roxen was used by large companies such as RealNetworks, Granada Media, Xmission and MCI.

Roxen was in many aspects ahead of its time, featuring a web-based graphical user interface (GUI) administration interface, loadable modules that could be written in several languages including Pike and later Java, dynamic content generation with a comprehensive caching system, replication systems for multi-headed servers, and an embedded SQL server for data-heavy server operations (as well as broad support for other databases). Roxen was built to meet the needs of content creators.

== RXML ==
RXML (RoXen Macro Language) is a server-side scripting language integrated into Roxen. This language has capabilities of scripting languages like Perl, but the HTML-like syntax makes it more familiar to content creators. Many Roxen sites were developed using the MVC pattern.

Notable tags include:

- <if> for conditional content (as well as tags for else, case, for, etc.)
- <tablify> for automatically transforming data into pretty tables
- <cache> for controlling the caching of dynamic content to reduce page fetch times/server loading
- <gbutton> and <gtext> image generation tags
- <diagram> for converting data into graphical charts/graphs
- <emit> for generating content based on LDAP, SQL or filesystem queries (its trivial to build your own photo gallery with thumbnails using Roxen)

Roxen modules typically provide their functionality by extending RXML.

All RXML tags contain inline documentation which is used to fill out the online manual that is included on both Roxen's documentation site and with every default server installation.

RXML also provides a variable system; all variables exist within a domain or "scope", e.g. form fields passed to the query are accessible as form.fieldname, user defined variables are stored in the var scope. Unfortunately, in its attempt to explain the two methods of variable instantiation, the documentation confuses most people.

In most cases, variables are referred to by name, but it is also possible to instantiate (insert the value of) a variable anywhere, in- or outside of tags/markup, using an XML entity-style markup, e.g. &page.path;. Optionally, one can specify encoding/escaping of the instance, e.g. &form.username:mysql; to insert a user-submitted value from a form safely into an SQL database or &page.path:js; to make a variable javascript safe.

== See also ==
- Comparison of web servers
- Server-side scripting
