= Stephen Globus =

Stephen Globus is a New York City venture capitalist who is third generation from a banking family. He is currently a founder and director of China Biopharmaceuticals Holdings, which is a medical company in China. He was a founding shareholder of Genitope Corporation, which is a San Francisco-area biotechnology company that designs custom treatments for cancer, including a vaccine to treat lymphoma.

== Career ==
Globus was founder and chairman of PlasmaCo which developed color plasma television and sold to Osaka-based Matsushita (Panasonic) in 1996. Globus was on the Japanese Board of Directors for the proceeding seven years after the sale. His other ventures activities include investment or managerial roles in Proscure (sold to Repligen), ExSar, Kimeragen which sold to a Paris-based company whose board Globus served on, Energy Research (Fuel Cell Energy), Nematron, and Tinsley Laboratories, which developed the optic correction for Hubble Space Telescope now a division of the Dutch company ASML.

Globus holds patents on panoramic cameras called the Globuscope. Globus is a founder of Globus Studios in Central Manhattan.
