= Project Runeberg =

Nordic digital cultural archive

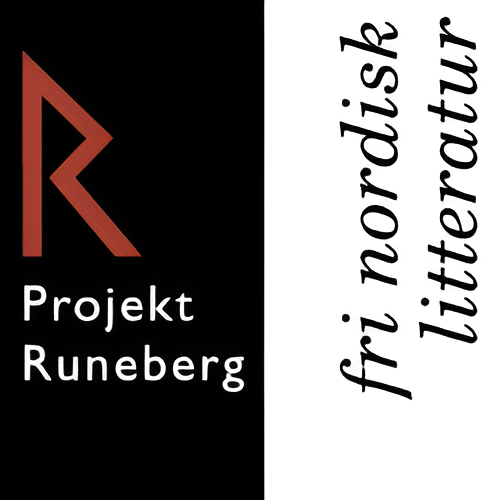
- Website type: Digital library
- Available in: Swedish, English
- Founded: June 1992 (34 years ago)
- Country of origin: Sweden
- Founder: Students of Lysator computer club at Linköping University
- Key people: Lars Aronsson
- Website: runeberg.org
- Commercial: No
- Registration: Optional
- Launched: gopher.lysator.liu.se 13 December 1992 (33 years ago) (Gopher); http://runeberg.org 29 October 2002 (23 years ago) (Website)
- Current status: Online

Project Runeberg (Swedish: Projekt Runeberg) is a digital-archive initiative for digitization of written works significant to the culture and history of the Nordic countries, with a focus on Scandinavian literature and writings. The Projekt Runeberg was founded by Swedish students of Linköping University, which began digitizing Nordic-language literature as early as 1991. The project takes its name from the Finnish national poet Johan Ludvig Runeberg and is a word-play of similar-natured Project Gutenberg.

== Nature ==
Projekt Runeberg is a digital cultural archive initiative that publishes free electronic versions of books and to digitize and archive written cultural works of literature, with a focus of Scandinavian and comparable Nordic origin with given cultural significance or historical importance.

It is patterned after the similar-named English-language cultural initiative Project Gutenberg and its similar effort, whereas the project's name is a word-play of the fact that old Nordic literature are often being written in Nordic Runes, and PG's ties to the name of German inventor Johannes Gutenberg – Inventor of the printing-press, which works eventually helped to quickly accelerate the spread of the Bible.

The initiative seeks to publish free electronic versions of formerly digitized books and writings as Ebooks in various formats such as EPub or PDF.

== History ==
The Runeberg-project itself was initiated by Swedish students around Lars Aronsson and other colleagues of the Lysator Academic Computer Club at the Linköping University, Sweden, which began systematically digitizing and archiving Nordic-language literature around June 1992, while efforts started as early as July 1991, when student Linus Tolke announced on the computer-club's conference-system LysKOM, to have started digitizing the Gospel of John of the Swedish Bible of 1917 (1917 års Bibelöversättning).

The Project began archiving its first Nordic-language literature pieces (parts of the Fänrik Ståls Sägner, of Nordic dictionaries and of a Bible from 1917) in December 1992.

As of 2015 it had accomplished digitization to provide graphical facsimiles of old works such as the Nordisk familjebok, and had accomplished, in whole or in part, the text extractions and copy-editing of these as well as esteemed Latin works and English translations from Nordic authors, sheet music and other texts of cultural interest. The project provides an extensive project-timeline with given milestones, beginning in 1991 being maintained since.

== Technology ==
By 2001, technology – image scanning and optical character recognition techniques – had improved enough to allow full digitization and text extraction of important target texts, e.g., of both print editions of the Nordisk familjebok (45,000 pages). Project Runeberg is hosted by an academic computer group, Lysator, at Linköping University, in Linköping in southern Sweden.

== See also ==
- Open content
- Project Gutenberg
- List of Danish online encyclopedic resources
