= Ericsson Portable PC =

Portable computer

- Also known as: EPPC
- Manufacturer: Ericsson
- Type: Portable computer
- Released: March 1985; 41 years ago
- Introductory price: US$2,995 (equivalent to $8,966 in 2025)
- Operating system: MS-DOS 2.1
- CPU: Intel 8088 CPU @ 4.77 MHz
- Memory: 256 kB of RAM (Expandable to 512 kB)
- Storage: half height 5-1/4 inch, 360 kB Floppy disk drive
- Display: Orange Gas Plasma display (25 line by 80 column)
- Graphics: 640 x 400 pixel
- Input: detachable keyboard
- Connectivity: parallel and serial ports, expansion port, second disk drive port
- Power: AC Power 110-240 V (No internal batteries)
- Weight: 8 kilograms (18 lb)

The Ericsson Portable PC (EPPC) is a portable computer introduced by Ericsson in March 1985. Looking like a thick beige briefcase, it weighs eight kilos. It has an Intel 8088 processor clocked at 4.77 MHz and 256-512 kB of RAM, is IBM PC compatible and runs MS-DOS. An optional built-in thermal printer and modem were available.

The EPPC was the first portable computer on the market with a plasma display: a monochrome amber unit displaying 80 by 25 characters or CGA graphics with the four colours distinguished by hatching.
