= Saab-Scania =

1969–1995 vehicle manufacturer in Sweden

Saab-Scania AB
- Predecessors: Saab AB; Scania-Vabis
- Founded: 1969; 57 years ago
- Defunct: 1995
- Fate: Split
- Successors: Scania AB; Saab Aircraft; Saab Automobile
- Headquarters: Sweden

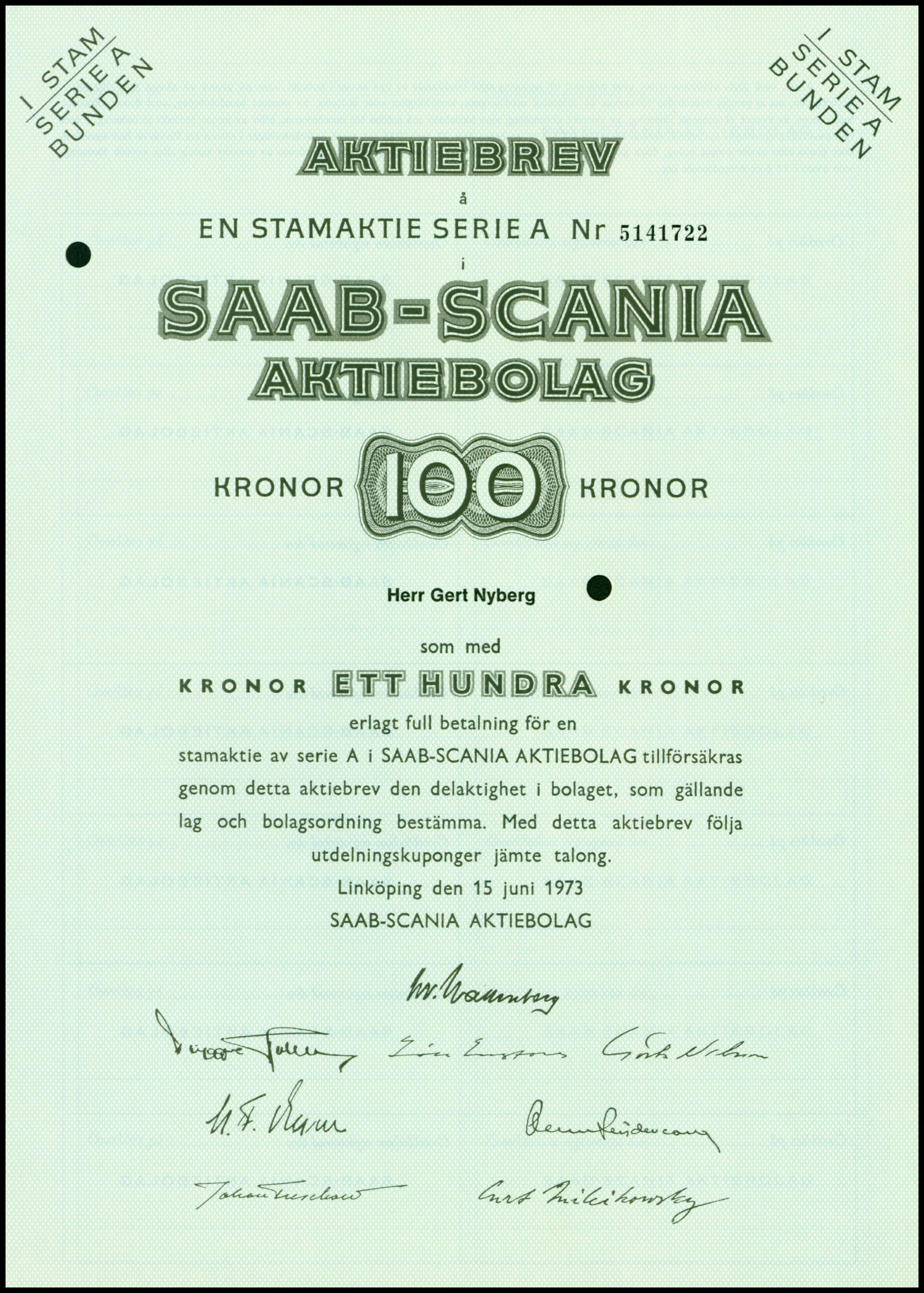
Share of the Saab-Scania AB, issued 15. June 1973

Saab-Scania AB was a Swedish vehicle manufacturer that was formed from the 1969 merger of Saab AB and Scania-Vabis. The company was split in 1995.

== History ==
Truck and bus manufacturer Scania AB of Södertälje merged with car and aeroplane manufacturer Saab AB of Trollhättan on 1 September 1969, under the Wallenberg family group of companies. The merger meant that Saab no longer had to import the British Triumph Slant-4 engine, and could instead use the engine production facilities of Scania. In 1972 they started manufacturing the 2.0 L B version. In 1977, Saab took advantage of Scania's experience with turbochargers and added one to the engine, thus creating one of the earliest turbocharged automobile engines to be produced in large numbers.

When the corporation was split in 1995, the name of the truck and bus division changed back to Scania AB. Saab Aircraft (Saab AB) and Saab cars were also split, with General Motors buying a major holding in Saab Automobile AB.

== Divisions ==
Saab-Scania consisted of following divisions:

- Aircraft (traded under the Saab AB brand) – until 1995
- Cars (traded under the Saab Automobile brand) – until 1990
- Trucks & Buses (traded under the Scania brand) – until 1995

== Subsidiaries ==
Saab-Scania had following subsidiaries:

- AB Svenska Järnvägsverkstädernas Aeroplanavdelning (ASJA) – until 1981
- Jönköping – until 1983
- Nordarmatur – until 1983
- Parca Norrahammar – until 1983
- MJ – until 1984
- Enertech – to 1988
- Combitech – from 1982 to 1995
- Saab-Valmet – from 1968 to 1992

== See also ==
- Marcus Wallenberg-hallen – Scania Museum in Södertälje, Sweden
- Swedish Air Force Museum – aircraft museum in Linköping, Sweden
