= Standard Radio & Telefon AB =

Swedish manufacturer of telecommunications systems and computers

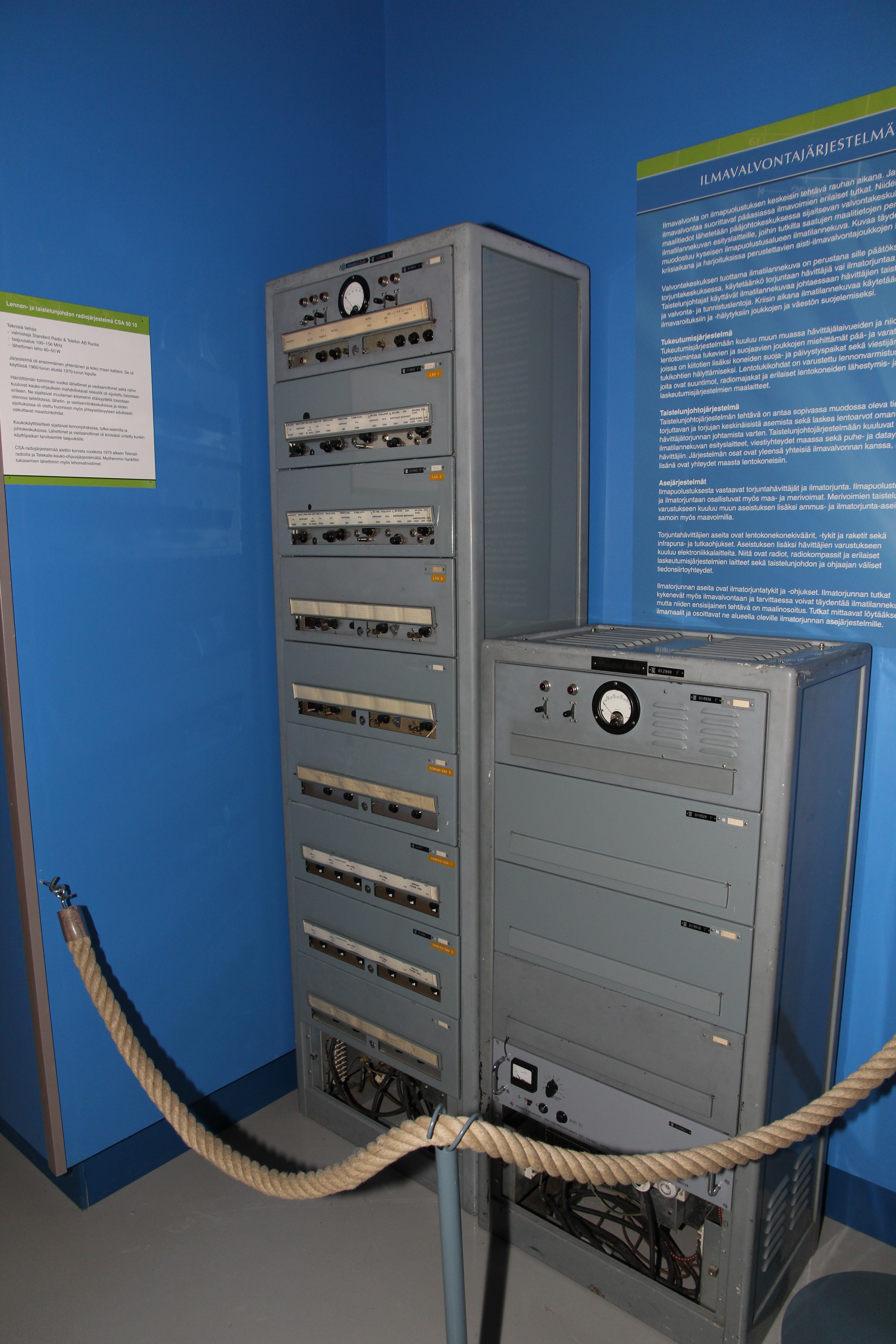
CSA 50/10 air traffic and fighter control radio system

Standard Radio & Telefon AB (SRT) was a Swedish telecommunications and computer manufacturer, at one time part of the ITT Corporation.

The factory was located in Bromma, north of Stockholm. They developed a range of HF radio products.

They developed an advanced mainframe as well as a computer terminal called Alfaskop that became an export success. A bit much of a success, since an export of a system for air traffic control to Moscow caused a diplomatic incident.

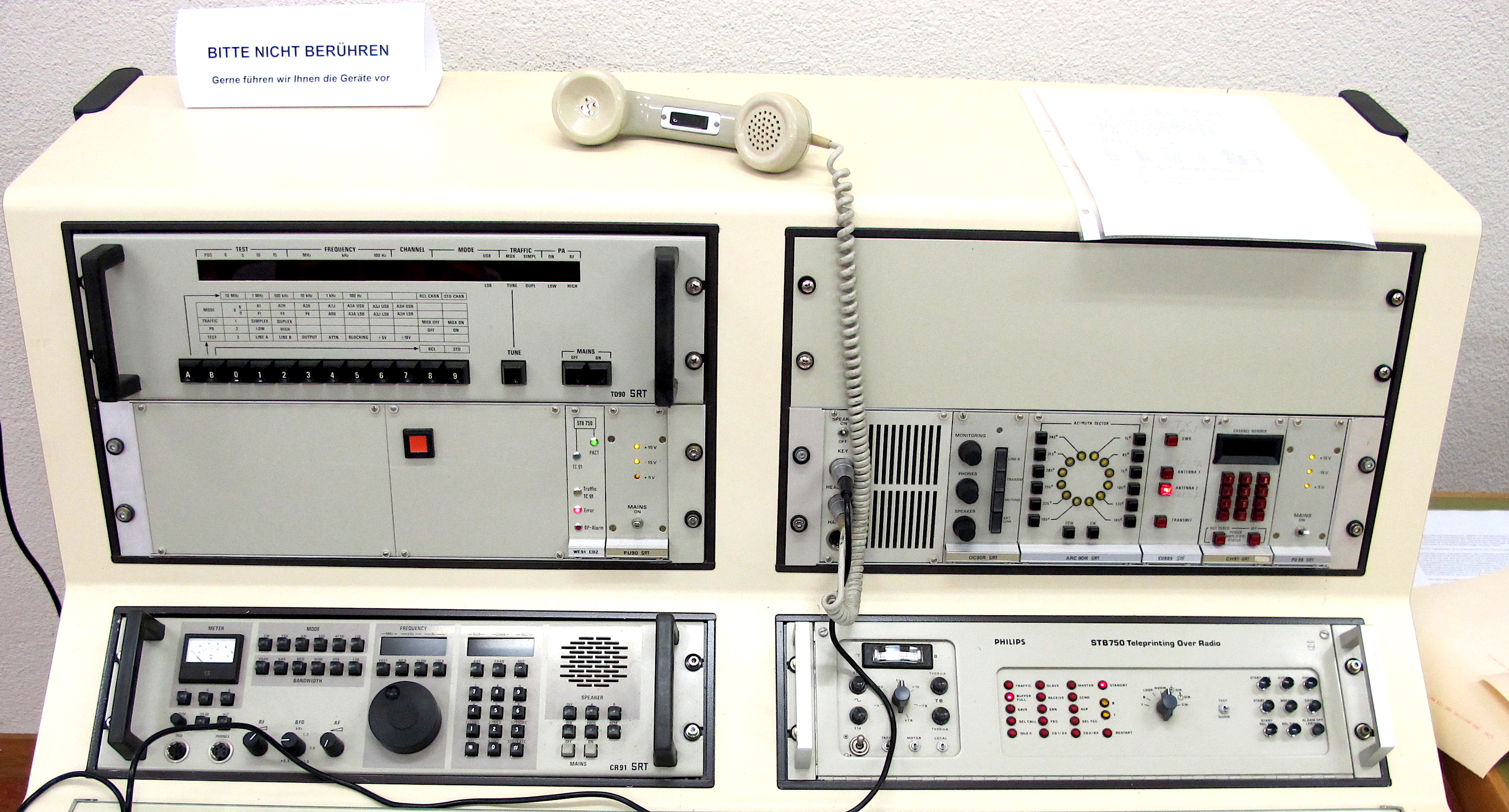
Radio System 90 - the DACOBAS desk at the central station Radio System 90 of SRT Standard Radio & Telefon AB - Embassy Radio training station - earlier used for the Swiss Embassy Radio System

More products :

VFT - Voice Frequency Telegraph system

ARTRAC - Automatic Radio TRAffic Controller

AEC 90 - Modem for SITOR, Simplex Teleprinting over Radio

TD 90 - HF Transmitter Driver

TD 91 - HF Transmitter Driver

CR 90 - HF Communication receiver

CR 91 - HF Communication receiver

SSA 400 - 400W HF Solid State Power Amplifier

SSA 420 - 400W HF Solid State Power Amplifier

SSA 1000 - 1000W Solid State Power Amplifier

SSA 1020 - 1000W Solid State MOSFET Power Amplifier

ATM 1000 - Automatic Antenna Coupler

BBD-367 - HF Broadband Dipole Antenna

Ra 200 - 8W HF Manpack Receiver-Transmitter for the Swedish military

***

List of customers :

* Swiss embassies

* Turkish embassies

* Malaysian embassies

* Algeria Civil Aviation Administration

* Interpol Stockholm and Zurich

* Ministry of Foreign Affairs, Stockholm. ( small system, they used Drake)

* HF system for Istanbul airport

* Selcall for Hercules aircraft, Arlanda

* Receivers and transmitters for the Danish Navy, still in use

* Receivers and transmitters for the Swedish Army,Navy and Air Force

* Receivers and transmitters for fixed, air/ground and maritime services, Swedish Telecommunications Administration, still in use

***

Some details about the Turkish Embassy Radio system :

The transmitter was the old driver CTD 500 with SSA 400 or SSA 1000. Receiver was the CR 300, two of them in the cabinet. The intention was to use space diversity. No place for two "real" Antennas, the second receiver got an active antenna AA300. Each receiver had a FSK demodulator, CRFD 1000.

The main use for the second receiver became a broadcast receiver. The system used FEC, equipment from Siemens, FEC 100. It could handle a total loss of signal for 1,5 second.

Antennas used was a logper from Granger, 6- 30 MHz. This Antenna used wires instead of solid elements. Some stations got an ATU 1000 with a 10m whip.

The teleprinter came from SAGEM, similar to Siemens T100.

Some 30-40 embassies was installed, from Washington in the West to Beijing in the East. The main station in Ankara had 12 Transmitters, remote controlled. some 400W some 1000 W. Remote control was via " Voice Frequency Telegraph" VFT system made by SRT.

Before SRT got the order a test system was set up between Berne and Ankara, everything worked fine and MOFA in Ankara signed the order.
