= 40-bit computing =

Computer architecture bit width

In computer architecture, 40-bit integers, memory addresses, or other data units are those that are 40 bits wide. Also, 40-bit central processing unit (CPU) and arithmetic logic unit (ALU) architectures are those that are based on registers, address buses, or data buses of that size.

== Examples ==
The IAS computer and many of its derivatives such as AVIDAC, BESK, ILLIAC I, JOHNNIAC, MANIAC I, ORACLE, ORDVAC, TIFRAC, and WEIZAC had 40-bit words.
