= TRASK (computer) =

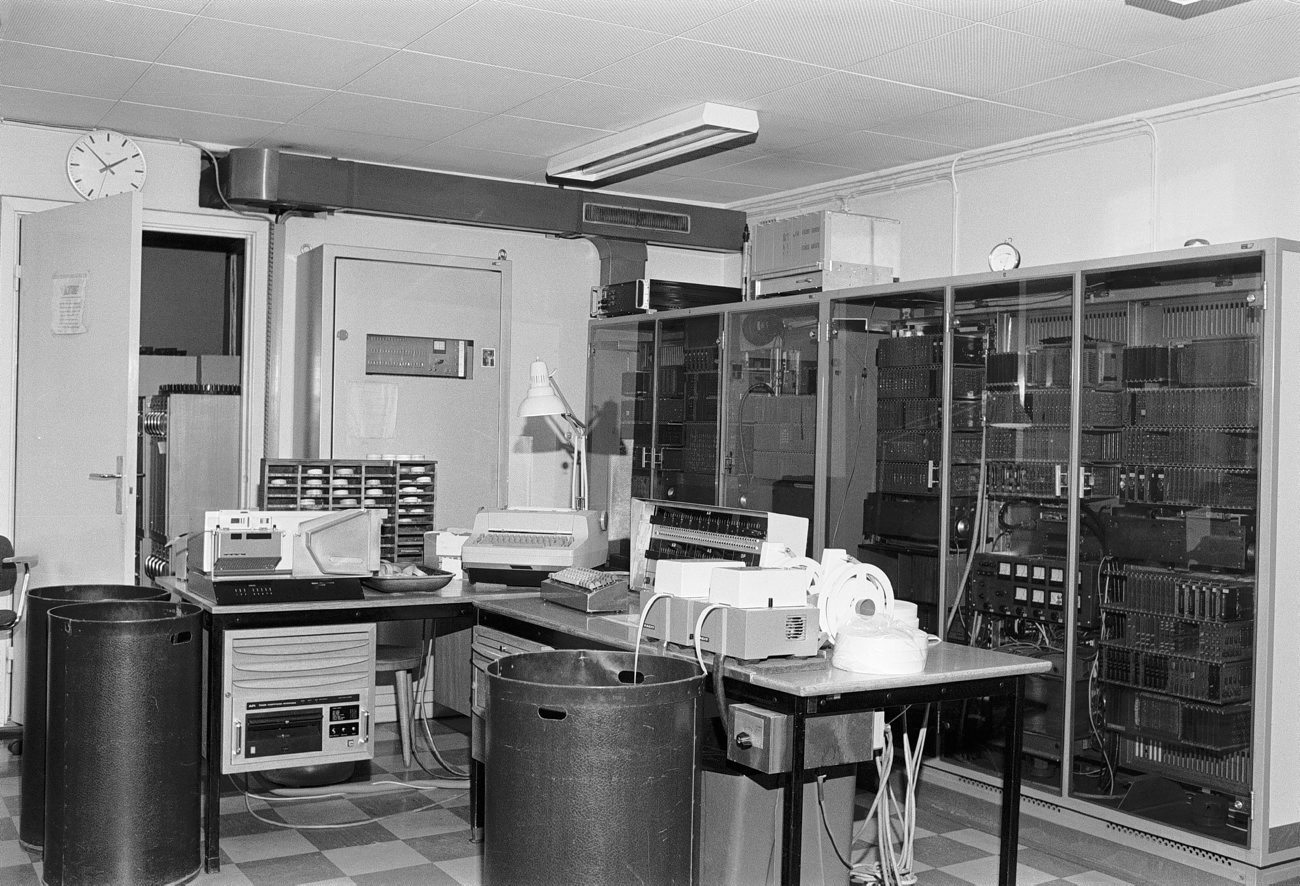
TRASK Transistorized sequence calculator

Trask or TRASK (TRAnsistorized Sequence Calculator) was a semiconductor based computer that begun development by the Swedish Board for Computing Machinery from 1960 and that went into use in 1965.

== History ==
Swedish Board for Computing Machinery that had developed BESK began in 1960 the work to develop a new semiconductor based computer. The plan was to create a faster machine with the experiences from BESK as a foundation but built using semiconductors that since the invention of the transistor in 1947 had become useful for this purpose. When the Swedish Board for Computing Machinery were dissolved in 1963, the development were half ways and the project was overtaken by the Nobelinstitutet för fysik in cooperation with AB Datasystem, Gunnar Hellström and the designer Zoltan Horvath. TRASK went into service in 1965 and were used until 1980 when it was donated to the Swedish National Museum of Science and Technology where it were rebuilt and was put into operation for demonstrations.

== Operating principle ==
TRASK is a fully transistorized mainframe intended for scientific calculations. It consists of central units in cabinets, two Facit ECM-64 carousel memories, Ampex memory unit (in a 19-inch rack, standing on top of the cabinets), paper tape readers, paper tape puncher, typewriter, maneuver panel and a desk.

Input- and output units were:

- Paper tape reader (in) 500-1000 characters/second. 5-8 channel strip
- Magnetic tape (in and out)
- Typewriter (out) circa 10 characters/second
- Paper tape puncher (out) circa 150 characters/second
- Teleprinter (out) 11 rows/second, 160 characters/row
- Control panel (in and out)
