= Margaret K. Butler =

American mathematician

Margaret Kampschaefer Butler
- Born: March 27, 1924; Evansville, Indiana
- Died: March 8, 2013 (aged 88)
- Occupation: Mathematician

Margaret Kampschaefer Butler (March 27, 1924 – March 8, 2013) was a mathematician who participated in creating and updating computer software. During the early 1950s, Butler contributed to the development of early computers. Butler was the first female fellow at the American Nuclear Society and director of the National Energy Software Center at Argonne. Butler held leadership positions within multiple scientific organizations and women's groups. She was the creator and director of the National Energy Software Center. Here, Butler operated an exchange for the editing of computer programs in regards to nuclear power and developed early principles for computer technology.

== Early life and education ==
Margaret Kampschaefer was born on March 27, 1924, in Evansville, Indiana, the middle child of three daughters born to Lou Etta and Otto Kampschaefer. Her father was a Mechanical Engineer graduate of Purdue University and her mother was a business school graduate who had worked as a bookkeeper before the children were born, remaining active in a business women's club, and sometimes covered club members work while they took holidays. The children were brought up with the expectation that they would go to college. Margaret Kampschaefer studied statistics and differential calculus at Indiana University Bloomington, having discovered the joy of mathematical accuracy during her undergraduate courses. She graduated in 1944.

== Career ==
Margaret Kampschaefer began her career in 1944 working as a statistician at the Bureau of Labor Statistics. While she worked there, she also taught math at the United States Department of Agriculture Graduate School and took graduate courses related to sampling theory.

About a year later, she joined the United States Army Air Forces and worked as a civilian in Germany. She returned to the United States after two years and began working in the Naval Reactors Division of Argonne National Laboratory as a junior mathematician.

While working at Argonne, Butler made calculations for physicists creating a prototype for a submarine reactor and attended atomic physics and reactor design classes. In 1949, she worked at the Bureau of Labor Statistics in Minnesota but returned to Argonne National Laboratory in 1951. Following her return to Argonne, Butler became an assistant mathematician in the Reactor Engineering Division and worked on AVIDAC, an early computer. Following marriage in 1951, she became known as Margaret Butler. In the 1950s she wrote software, reactor applications, mathematical subroutines, and utilities for three other Argonne computers, the ORACLE, GEORGE, and UNIVAC.

Butler led Argonne's Applied Mathematics Division's Application Programming from 1959 to 1965. While working in this department, she developed teams to fix program problems in reactors, biology, chemistry, physics, management, and high energy physics applications. In 1960, she worked with others to establish the Argonne Code Center, which later became the National Energy Software Center (NESC). Butler would later become director of the NESC from 1972–1991.

She became the first woman to be named fellow of the American Nuclear Society in 1972, following her nomination a year earlier. She was also a consultant to the European Nuclear Energy Agency during the time it was establishing its computer program.

In 1980, Butler was promoted to Senior Computer Scientist at Argonne. She officially retired in 1991, but continued to work at Argonne from 1993 to 2006 as a "special term appointee".

== Impact ==
During her time in Argonne, Butler was very supportive of her female coworkers. Women working at Argonne described her as a role model with a welcoming presence. According to her son Jay, she thought women were "given all the responsibilities and none of the authorities" and had to work "harder and smarter" yet were still not treated as individuals. When Butler rose in the ranks at Argonne, she made sure to hire women and recommend them for promotions.

She worked with other women to organize an Association for Women in Science in Chicago. While in AWIS, she held executive board positions and led two conferences for high school students, teachers, and administration.

The Argonne Leadership Computing Facility established the Margaret Butler Fellowship in Computational Science, a postdoctoral fellowship in her honor.

== Personal life ==
In 1951 Margaret Kampschaefer married Jim Butler, a mathematician she met through work. They had a son Jay in 1954 and Butler later recalled that “when I was pregnant, I thought I would announce the fact by wearing a maternity outfit to work. Much to my astonishment, Dr. Chu managed to overlook the fact, saying that it was wise of me to find an outfit designed to keep me free of chalk dust from the office chalkboard”. Her request for maternity leave caused consternation as the laboratory had no such policy and it had been assumed Butler would resign. She was eventually granted leave without pay after being asked to have a physical in Health Services. She was amused by and kept the letter issued by the doctor which stated "We are able to report that the examinations conducted revealed … a ‘Condition of which you are aware'".
