= FACIT EDB =

First-generation computer in Sweden

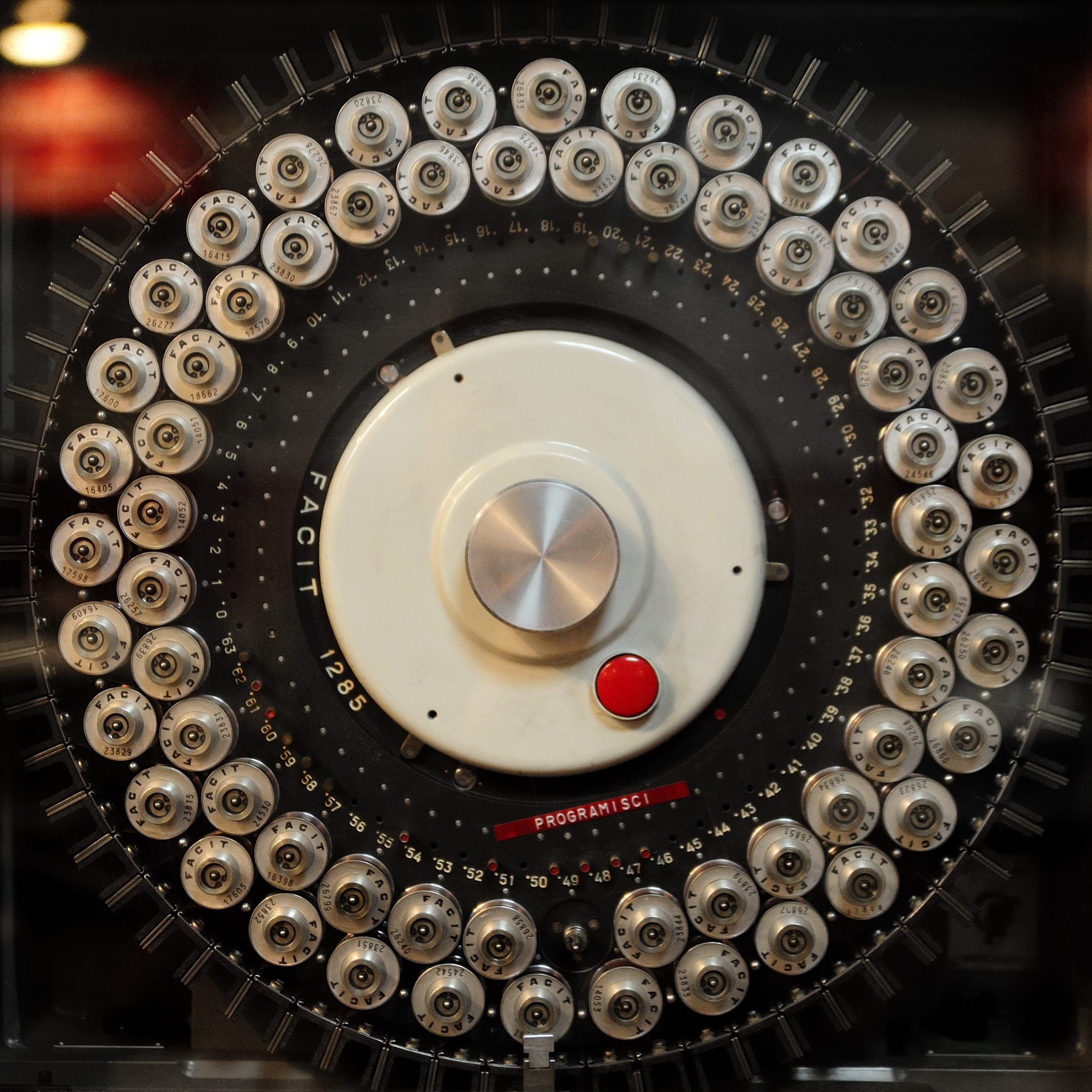
The carousel memory from Facit shortened the access time significantly

FACIT EDB is a computer that was based on vacuum tubes that was manufactured by Åtvidabergs Industrier AB after the designs for BESK, that had been developed by the Swedish Board for Computing Machinery (Matematikmaskinnämnden).

FACIT EDB was the first fully Swedish series production computer. EDB stod for "Electronic Computer Processing". The manufacturing was done by Åtvidabergs Industrier department of electronics in Stockholm and came to fruition by recruiting 18 key persons from the Swedish Board for Computing Machinery (Matematikmaskinnämnden), internally nicknamed "the Besk boys". In 1960 the department became Facit Electronics with a new factory in Solna. The recruitment of people from Swedish Board for Computing Machinery were approved by the Finance minister Gunnar Sträng. That thought that production of computers was not something the government should be involved in. In 1963 a FACIT EDB-3 was installed at National Defence Radio Establishment (FRA) which enabled use at any time of the day.

== History ==
In 1956 Åtvidabergs industrier recruited seventeen people from the Swedish Board for Computing Machinery that had developed the BESK computer. The same year the company bought the design drawings for BESK and the first copy was inaugurated in October 1957. It had some improvements, like the double amount of magnetic-core memory, and later came a new advanced magnetic tape memory, the carousel memory.

FACIT EDB was installed as a service machine in Åtvidaberg industries facilities at Karlavägen in Stockholm. It meant that customers could come and run their own programs for payment per the hour. The machine became heavily used, the need for calculations existed among others in meteorology.

== Operation ==
The FACIT EDB was like the BESK computer as it was a so-called IAS machine. The original IAS machine was completed at Massachusetts Institute of Technology (MIT) in 1951. FACIT EDB was programmed by loading a program into the working memory, where also input and output data could be stored. IAS-based machines were not software compatible, but build on drawings of the original IAS machine architecture.

FACIT EDB was a copy of the BESK, and was built with a combination of electron tubes and germanium diodes. The programs were fitted with break points so that the calculation could be resumed after some electron tube had burnt out and been replaced. Magnetic core was used as working memory.

Input and output units were:

- Paper tape reader (input) 500-1000 characters/second. 5-8 channel strip.
- Magnetic tape, carousel memory from 1958, (input and output)
- Typewriter (output) circa 10 characters/second.
- Paper tape puncher (output) circa 150 characters/second.
- Teleprinter (output) 11 rows/second, 160 characters/row.
- Control panel (input and output).

Software and programs for the machine included an ALGOL compiler, machine code compiler and operating system. The machine could also run various programs developed for BESK.
