= Z23 =

Z23 may refer to:

- Z23 (computer), a computer built by Konrad Zuse in 1961
- German destroyer Z23, a destroyer built for the Kriegsmarine in the late 1930s
- The ICD-10 code for "encounter for immunization".
