= Elsa-Karin Boestad-Nilsson =

Swedish computing pioneer (1925–2020)

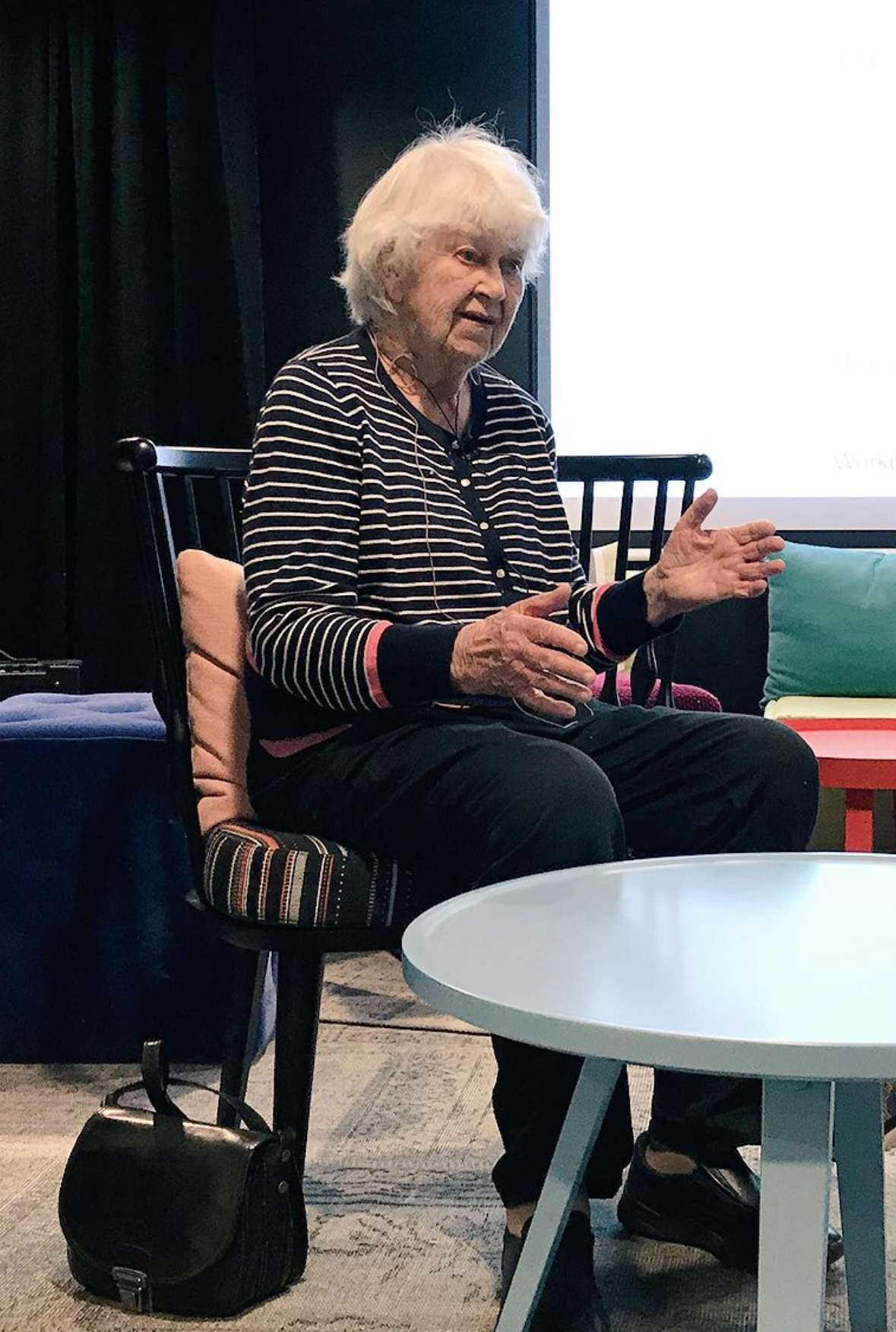
Photo of Elsa-Karin Boestad-Nilsson, taken by Anders Frick at Gbg startup hacks meetup, 2018-04-11

Elsa-Karin Boestad-Nilsson (25 November 1925 – 27 March 2020) was a Swedish computing pioneer who programmed the first and second computers in Sweden, BARK and BESK.

Boestad-Nilsson was born on 25 November 1925 in Stockholm, the daughter of mechanical engineering professor Gustav Boestad. After earning a degree in mathematics at Stockholm University in 1948, she joined the Swedish National Defence Research Institute (FOA) in the same year, as the only degreed woman there at the time. Her initial work involved using mechanical calculators from the Facit company to solve problems in aerodynamics, and although she found novel methods to speed up these calculations, she did not dare to publish them.

By 1952, these calculators, and the women operating them, had been made obsolete by new analog computers imported from the US and operated by male civil engineers. Instead, she took a course in computer programming and began working as a programmer. Her initial work in this area was on BARK, a programmable electromechanical computer that became the first programmable computer in Sweden. BESK, Sweden's second computer, was based on vacuum tube technology instead of relays, and began operations in 1954, with Boestad-Nilsson as one of its initial programmers. Among other projects, the BESK computer, and Boestad-Nilsson's calculations on it, were used in the Swedish nuclear weapons program. It was through this work that she met Per-Olof (Olle) Nilsson, a scientist in the program, whom she married in 1956.

In 1957, Boestad-Nilsson was named head of the scientific calculation group at FOA. She became head of the department of mathematics and data processing in 1974. At around this time, she became an activist for women's rights, through the Fredrika Bremer Association, in reaction to a 1975 FOA personnel memo that recommended paying all women employees (including managers such as her) equal low rates of pay, in order to prevent them from becoming jealous of each other. She left FOA in 1981 to work for an organization promoting the use of the Ada programming language, and retired in 1990. She died on 27 March 2020.
