= Z25 =

Z25 may refer to:

- Z25 (computer), a computer built by Konrad Zuse
- German destroyer Z25, a Type 1936A destroyer built for the Kriegsmarine during World War II
- New South Wales Z25 class locomotive, a class of 2-6-0 wheel arrangement steam locomotive built for and operated by the New South Wales Government Railways
