= Cyclone (computer) =

Vacuum tube computer built by Iowa State College

The Cyclone is a vacuum-tube computer, built by Iowa State College (later University) at Ames, Iowa. The computer was commissioned in July 1959. It was based on the IAS architecture developed by John von Neumann. The Cyclone was based on ILLIAC, the University of Illinois Automatic Computer. The Cyclone used 40-bit words, used two 20-bit instructions per word, and each instruction had an eight-bit op-code and a 12-bit operand or address field. In general IAS-based computers were not code compatible with each other, although originally math routines which ran on the ILLIAC would also run on the Cyclone.

The Cyclone was completed just as the transistor was replacing the vacuum tube as an active computing element. The Cyclone had about 2,500 vacuum tubes, 1,521 of which were type 5844. (The IBM 1401 computer, announced the same year, was fully transistorized. About 15,000 IBM 1401 machines were produced.)

The supervisor of the Cyclone computer construction was Dr. R. M. Stewart, a professor of physics at ISC (now ISU). The paper-tape input was upgraded with an optical character reader using a high-speed stepper motor, again by a person from the Physics Department. Robert Asbury Sharpe organized and taught courses for interested faculty and wrote an assembler as well as an ALGOL compiler for the Cyclone.

The Cyclone solved 40 equations with 40 unknowns in less than four minutes. This was the same type of problem that the Atanasoff–Berry Computer was designed to solve twenty years earlier at the same college.

The Cyclone computer was 10 feet tall, 12 feet long, 3 feet wide, and contained over 2,700 vacuum tubes. It used 19 kW of electric power and weighed about 5,000 pounds (2.5 short tons; 2.3 t). "Good time" was about 40 hours per week.

The original Cyclone had:

1. Input and output via five-hole paper tape.
2. A model 28 Teleprinter, 10 characters per second, was also available for output.
3. Memory was originally 1,024 40-bit words of Williams tube electrostatic memory.

The Cyclone had a major rebuild about 1961:

1. Five-hole paper tape was replaced by an eight-hole tape reader/punch.
2. The console printer was upgraded to an eight-hole Friden Flexowriter.
3. 1024-word Williams memory was replaced by four banks of magnetic-core memory, 4096 words in each bank.

Both versions had features and limitations:

- All IAS derivatives used an asynchronous CPU, with no clock. Each unit generated an "answer-back" or "I'm ready" signal, which permitted the output to be used or the next step taken. Most computers designed since then are "synchronous", meaning after a certain number of clock cycles the unit is finished with the pending operation, for example an addition.
- There were no index registers. To access sequential data in a loop, programs used address modification in the instructions instead of incrementing or decrementing an index.
- The Cyclone had a loudspeaker system connected to the sign bit of the accumulator. Operators or monitors could listen for an infinite loop or particular program. When the computer was finished, the memory exerciser program was started, which had a distinctive sound - signaling others that the machine was available. Speakers were placed in offices and work areas for convenience.

The only input device was the paper tape reader and the only outputs were the console printer and paper tape punch. As the paper tape punch was much faster than the printer, most output was punched, and then listed on an off-line printer.

The Iowa State Cyclone is distinct from the Atanasoff–Berry Computer of the late 1930s - neither John Vincent Atanasoff nor Clifford Berry worked on this machine.

== See also ==
- IAS machine
- Computer music
- LaFarr Stuart
