= Odhner =

Odhner is a Swedish family. Notable members include:

== People ==
- Bengt Odhner (1918–1990), Swedish diplomat
- Clas Theodor Odhner (1836–1904), Swedish historian, director of the Swedish National Archives
- Willgodt Theophil Odhner (1845–1905), Swedish engineer and inventor of the Odhner Arithmometer working in Russia
- Nils Johan Teodor Odhner (1879–1928), Swedish arctic explorer and zoologist who studied trematodes and decapod crustaceans
- Nils Hjalmar Odhner (1884–1973), Swedish zoologist who studied mollusks

== Other ==
- Odhner Arithmometer, a mechanical calculator invented by Willgodt Theophil Odhner
- AB Original-Odhner, a Swedish company manufacturing Odhner calculators
- Facit-Odhner, a subsidiary of Facit AB, which bought AB Original-Odhner in 1942
