= Karlqvist gap =

The Karlqvist gap or Karlqvist Field is an electromagnetic phenomenon discovered in 1953 by the Swedish engineer Olle Karlqvist (1922-1976), which is important in magnetic storage for computers.

Karlqvist discovered the phenomenon while designing a ferromagnetic surface layer to the magnetic drum memory for the BESK computer. When designing a magnetic memory store, the ferromagnetic layer must be studied to determine the variation of the magnetic field with permeability, air gap, layer thickness and other influencing factors. The problem is non-linear and extremely difficult to solve. Karlqvist's gap discovery shows that the non-linear problem could be approximated by a linear boundary value for the two-dimensional static field and the one-dimensional transient field. This linear calculation gives a first approximation.

Karlqvist published his discovery in the 1954 paper "Calculation of the magnetic field in ferromagnetic layer of a magnetic drum" at KTH Royal Institute of Technology in Stockholm.

== See also ==
- Carousel memory, 2560-kilobyte storage unit first sold in 1958
