= LaFarr Stuart =

American computer programmer

- Born: July 6, 1934; Clarkston, Utah, United States
- Died: July 26, 2021 (aged 87)
- Occupation: Computer engineering (retired)
- Website: web.archive.org/web/20200208191002/http://zyvra.org/lafarr

LaFarr Stuart (July 6, 1934 - July 26, 2021), was an early computer music pioneer, computer engineer and member of the Homebrew Computer Club.

== Career ==
In 1961, Stuart programmed Iowa State University's Cyclone computer, a derivative of the ILLIAC, to play simple, recognizable tunes through an amplified speaker that had been attached to the system originally for administrative and diagnostic purposes. A recording of an interview with Stuart and his computer music was broadcast nationally on the National Broadcasting Company's NBC Radio Network program Monitor on February 10, 1962.

In a subsequent interview with the Harold Journal, Navel Hunsaker, head of the Utah State University mathematics department, said of Stuart, "He always was a whiz with calculators."

From the late 1970s, Stuart mentored John Carlsen, who later contributed to the rapid growth of personal computer (PC) sound-card maker Media Vision and to SigmaTel.

In the late 1960s and early 1970s, Stuart worked for Control Data Corporation (CDC), where Seymour Cray designed the CDC 6600, the first commercial supercomputer.

During the 1970s, Stuart created a version of the programming language Forth, which became known as LaFORTH. It is notable for its implementation without an input buffer.

In the 1980s, Stuart worked for Zytrex, which manufactured complementary metal–oxide–semiconductor (CMOS) Programmable Array Logic (PAL) programmable logic devices (PLDs).

Stuart conceived installing battery-operated real-time clocks into computers, for which he received royalty payments until nearly 2000. Stuart jokingly admits contributing to the Year 2000 problem.

== Preserving computer history ==
Stuart owned the first Digital Equipment Corporation (DEC) PDP-11 to enter California and often visited the Computer History Museum in Mountain View, California.

== See also ==
- E-mu Systems
- Robert Moog
