= Wallace Givens =

American mathematician (1910–1993)

James Wallace Givens, Jr. (December 14, 1910 – March 5, 1993) was a mathematician and a pioneer in computer science. He is the eponym of the well-known Givens rotations. Born the son of two teachers in Alberene, Virginia (a small town near Charlottesville), he obtained his bachelor's degree from their young alma mater, Lynchburg College in 1928 at the age of 17; his master's degree from the University of Virginia under Ben Zion Linfield in 1931 (after a one-year fellowship at the University of Kentucky); and his doctorate from Princeton University in 1936 under Oswald Veblen. (Dissertation title: Tensor Coordinates of Linear Spaces.)

He was an assistant to Veblen at the Institute for Advanced Study during his doctoral work, and later a professor at the University of Tennessee in Knoxville, Tennessee. He also taught at Wayne State University and Northwestern University, and worked early on with UNIVAC I at the Courant Institute of New York University (NYU) and later with ORACLE at Oak Ridge (both early vacuum tube computers).

In 1963 he was appointed senior scientist at the Argonne National Laboratory near Chicago, where he was later (1964-1970) director of the Division of Applied Mathematics. From 1968 to 1970 he was fourteenth president of the Society for Industrial and Applied Mathematics. In 1979 he retired as professor emeritus at Northwestern University. Argonne National Laboratory currently offers a named fellowship in his honor.

== Selected publications ==
- Givens, Wallace (1940). "Factorization and signatures of Lorentz matrices". Bull. Amer. Math. Soc. 46 (2): 81–85. doi:10.1090/s0002-9904-1940-07137-x. MR 0001204.
- Givens, Wallace (1947). "Parametric solutions of linear homogeneous diophantine equations" (PDF). Bull. Amer. Math. Soc. 53 (8): 780–783. doi:10.1090/s0002-9904-1947-08879-0. MR 0021552.
- Givens, Wallace (1952). "Fields of values of a matrix". Proc. Amer. Math. Soc. 3 (2): 206–209. doi:10.1090/s0002-9939-1952-0047004-9. MR 0047004.
