= Palm calculus =

Topic in probability

In the study of stochastic processes, Palm calculus, named after Swedish teletrafficist Conny Palm, is the study of the relationship between probabilities conditioned on a specified event and time-average probabilities. A Palm probability or Palm expectation, often denoted $P^0(\cdot)$ or $E^0[\cdot]$, is a probability or expectation conditioned on a specified event occurring at time 0.

== Little's formula ==
A simple example of a formula from Palm calculus is Little's law $L=\lambda W$, which states that the time-average number of users (L) in a system is equal to the product of the rate ($\lambda$) at which users arrive and the Palm-average waiting time (W) that a user spends in the system. That is, the average W gives equal weight to the waiting time of all customers, rather than being the time-average of "the waiting times of the customers currently in the system".

== Feller's paradox ==
An important example of the use of Palm probabilities is Feller's paradox, often associated with the analysis of an M/G/1 queue. This states that the (time-)average time between the previous and next points in a point process is greater than the expected interval between points. The latter is the Palm expectation of the former, conditioning on the event that a point occurs at the time of the observation. This paradox occurs because large intervals are given greater weight in the time average than small intervals.
