= Palm–Khintchine theorem =

Theorem in probability theory

In probability theory, the Palm–Khintchine theorem, the work of Conny Palm and Aleksandr Khinchin, expresses that a large number of renewal processes, not necessarily Poissonian, when combined ("superimposed") will have Poissonian properties.

It is used to generalise the behaviour of users or clients in queuing theory. It is also used in dependability and reliability modelling of computing and telecommunications.

== Theorem ==
According to Heyman and Sobel (2003), the theorem states that the superposition of a large number of independent equilibrium renewal processes, each with a finite intensity, behaves asymptotically like a Poisson process:

Let $\{N_i(t),t\geq 0\}, i=1,2,\ldots, m$ be independent renewal processes and $\{N(t),t>0\}$ be the superposition of these processes. Denote by $X_{jm}$ the time between the first and the second renewal epochs in process $j$. Define $N_{jm}(t)$ the $j$th counting process, $F_{jm}(t)=P(X_{jm}\leq t)$ and $\lambda_{jm}=1/(E((X_{jm)}))$.

If the following assumptions hold

1) For all sufficiently large $m$: $\lambda_{1m}+\lambda_{m}+\cdots+\lambda_{mm}=\lambda<\infty$

2) Given $\varepsilon>0$, for every $t>0$ and sufficiently large $m$: $F_{jm}(t)<\varepsilon$ for all $j$

then the superposition $N_{0m}(t)=N_{1m}(t)+N_{m}(t)+\cdots+N_{mm}(t)$ of the counting processes approaches a Poisson process as $m \to \infty$.

== See also ==
- Law of large numbers
