= SMIL (computer) =

Swedish first-generation computer

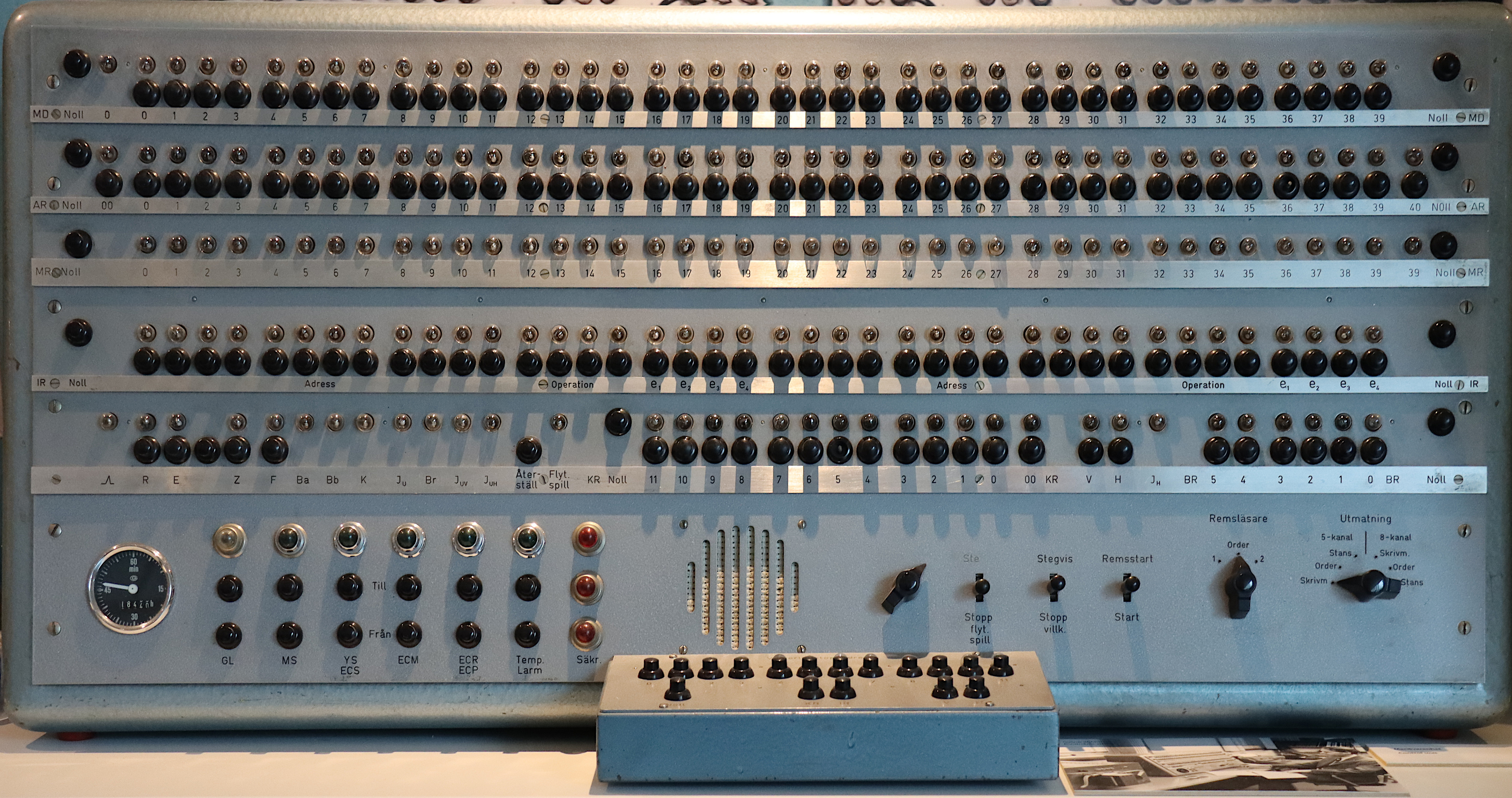
Manoeuver panel to the Swedish SMIL computer, now at the "Teknikens och sjöfartens hus" in Malmö, Sweden (2022)

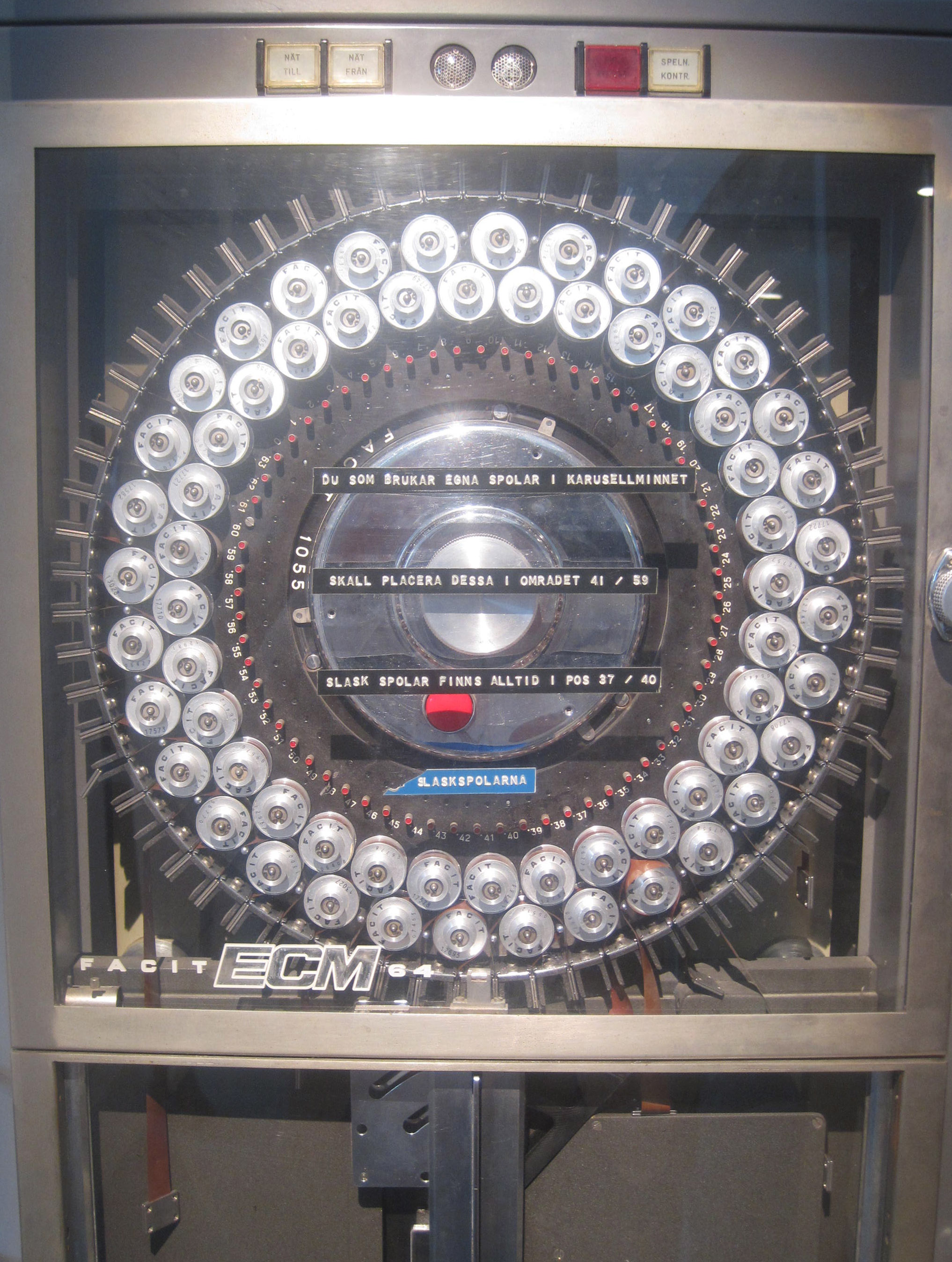
Carousel memory for SMIL, now at the "Teknikens och sjöfartens hus" in Malmö, Sweden (2013)

SMIL (Swedish: Siffermaskinen i Lund, "The Number Machine in Lund") was a first-generation computer built at Lund University in Lund, Sweden. SMIL was based on the IAS architecture developed by John von Neumann.

Carl-Erik Fröberg belonged to the group of five young Swedish scientists that IVA sent to the U.S. in 1947–48 to gather information about the early computer development. They then came to strongly influence the development in Sweden. Fröberg visited with Erik Stemme the Institute for Advanced Study, and John von Neumann's research group. Back in Lund, he played a leading role in the creation of SMIL, which was the first computer developed in Lund and among the first in Sweden. SMIL was introduced in 1956 and then was in operation until 1970.

In February 1962 SMIL was fitted with a compiler for ALGOL 60. The compiler was constructed by Torgil Ekman and Leif Robertson.

Carl-Erik Fröberg was also behind the early emergence of numerical analysis as a separate university subject. In this context, he wrote himself and collaborated with others on several textbooks in computer education, for example, Textbook on Numerical Analysis (1962) and Textbook of Algol (1964). These books were widely distributed and translated into several languages.

Parts of SMIL are exhibited at Malmö Technical Museum.

On January 4, 2006, an emulator of SMIL named SMILemu was released with a Java and Mac OS X version.

== See also ==
- BARK - Binär Aritmetisk Relä-Kalkylator - Sweden's first computer
- BESK - Binär Elektronisk Sekvens-Kalkylator - Sweden's second computer
- Torsten Hägerstrand – a Swedish geographer (and friend of Fröberg) who used SMIL
