= Z25 (computer) =

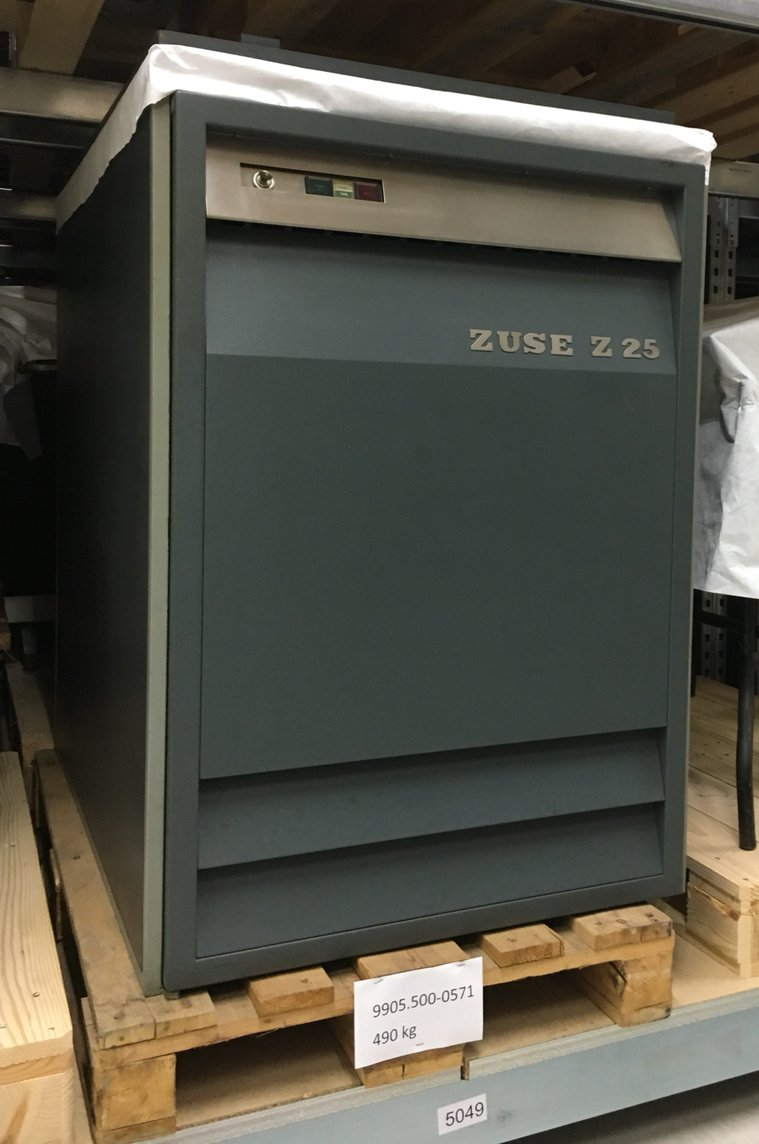
- Also known as: Zuse Z25
- Developer: Konrad Zuse
- Manufacturer: Zuse KG
- Released: 1963; 63 years ago
- Units sold: 110 in Germany, 10 in foreign countries (2 in Moscow)
- CPU: @ 180 kHz
- Storage: Drum memory
- Removable storage: Magnetic tape memory, punched tape and punched cards
- Display: Teleprinter
- Predecessor: Z23
- Successor: Z26

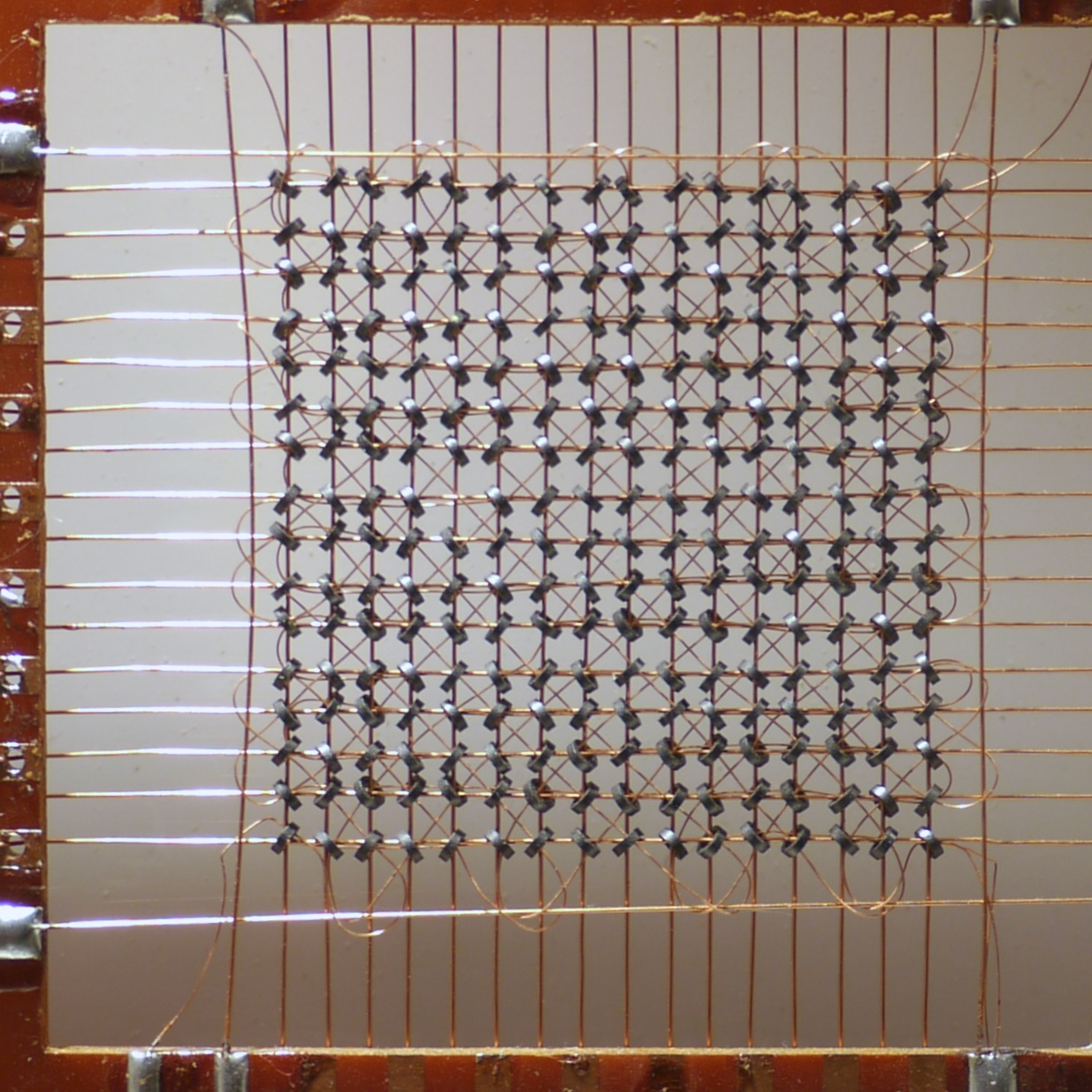
Ferrite-core memory included in the Z22, Z23 and Z25

The Zuse Z25 was a program-controlled electronic computer using transistors developed by Zuse KG in Bad Hersfeld and put into production in 1963. The word length was 18 bits, though it could also process double-word lengths for accuracy up to 10 decimal digits. The addressable space was 32768 words. The maximum size of the magnetic core memory was 16383 words. The programmable program memory had a maximum size of 4096 words.

For mass storage there was a drum memory available as well as a magnetic tape memory. The magnetic drum had a storage capacity of 17664 Z25 words. The transmission speed was 6900 words per second. The magnetic tape memory had a capacity of 1 million Z25 words and a transmission speed of approximately 33000 Z25 words per second. In- and output was through punched tape and punched cards; it was also possible to print to a teleprinter.

The computer could carry out approximately 7100 arithmetic operations per second at a clock rate of 180 kHz. Several Z25s could be connected in a network. The Z25 could be used for the control and data acquisition of external devices through a program-interrupt system with up to 32 channels. This also allowed it to control the Graphomat Z64 directly and without exchanging the data via punched tape.
