= BARK (computer) =

Early Swedish electromechanical computer

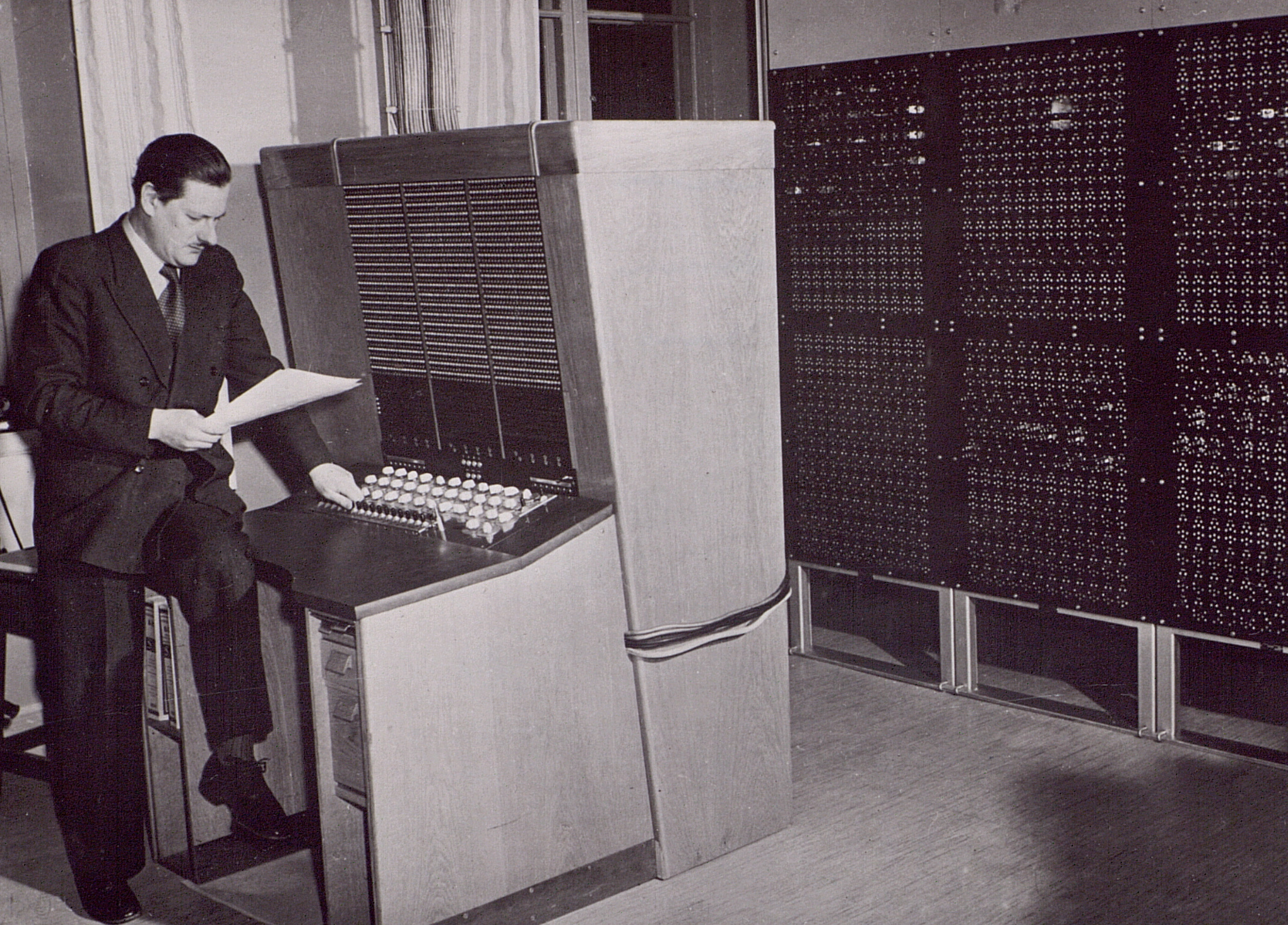
Conny Palm and BARK.

BARK (Swedish: Binär Aritmetisk (Automatisk) Relä-Kalkylator, lit. 'Binary Arithmetic (Automatic) Relay Calculator') was an early electromechanical computer built in 1950. BARK was built using standard telephone relays, implementing a 32-bit binary machine. It could perform addition in 150 ms and multiplication in 250 ms. It had a memory with 50 registers and 100 constants. The memory was later expanded to twice that. Howard Aiken stated in reference to BARK "This is the first computer I have seen outside Harvard that actually works."

== History ==
BARK was developed by Matematikmaskinnämnden (Swedish Board for Computing Machinery) a few years before BESK. The machine was built with 8,000 standard telephone relays, 80 km of cable and with 175,000 soldering points. Programming was done by plugboard. It was completed in February 1950 at a cost of 400,000 Swedish kronor (less than $100,000). It became operational on April 28, 1950, and was taken offline on September 22, 1954. The engineers on the team led by Conny Palm were Harry Freese, Gösta Neovius, Olle Karlqvist, Carl-Erik Fröberg, G. Kellberg, Björn Lind, Arne Lindberger, P. Petersson and Madeline Wallmark.

== See also ==
- BESK – Binär Elektronisk Sekvens-Kalkylator – Sweden's second computer.
- Elsa-Karin Boestad-Nilsson, a programmer on BARK and BESK
- SMIL – SifferMaskinen I Lund (The Number Machine in Lund)
- History of computing hardware
- List of relay computers
