= SARA (computer) =

SARA (SAABs räkneautomat, SAAB's calculating machine) was developed by SAAB when the capacity of BESK was insufficient for their needs. The project was started the fall of 1955 and became operational in 1956. SARA was built using the drawings of BESK that SAAB had bought for a symbolic sum and with the help of people who had worked with BESK, but did not stay when Matematikmaskinnämnden decided that there would be no second generation of the computer. SARA was not used much, but it became the start of DataSAAB and the development of CK37 and D2.
