= Carousel memory =

Early type of computer external data storage

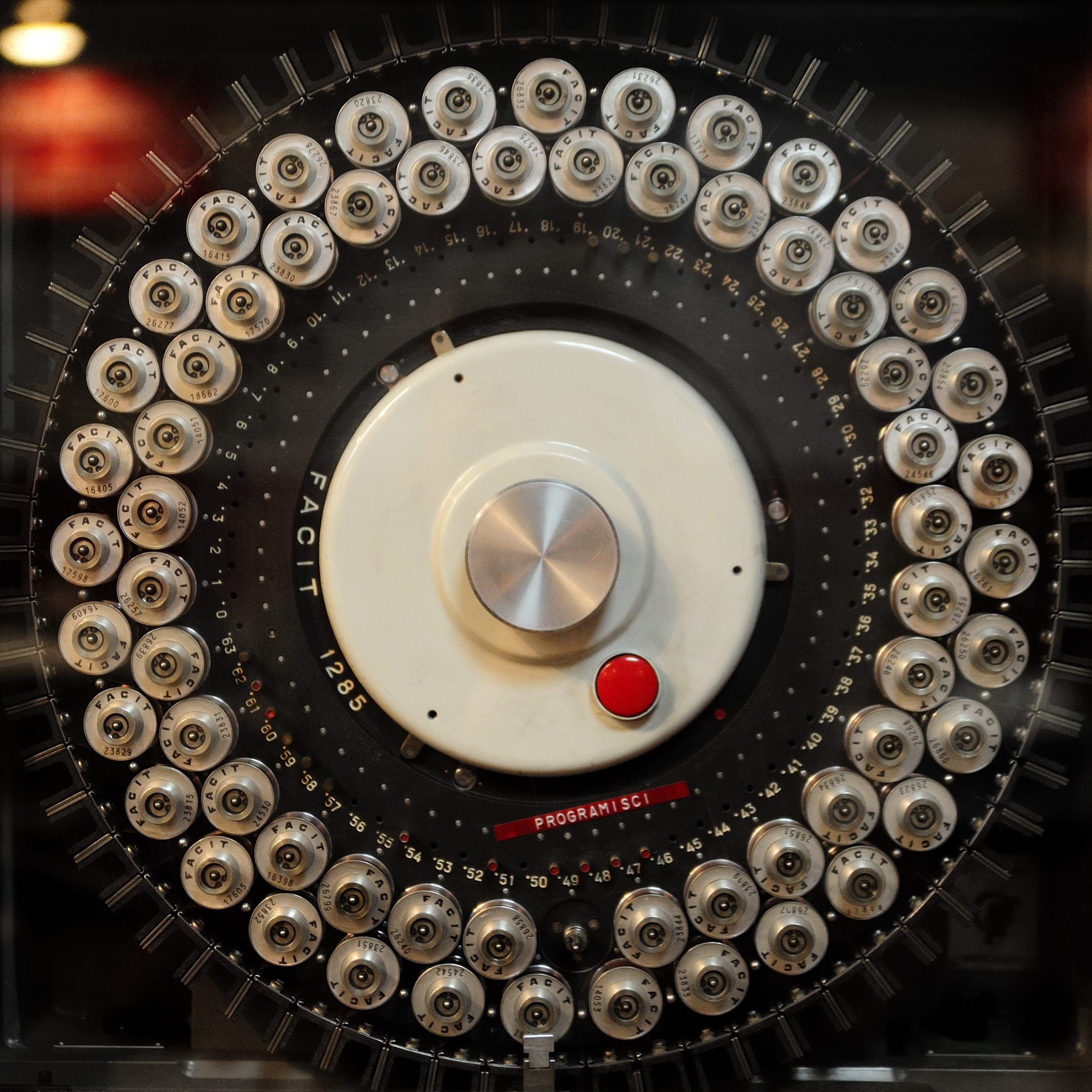
Carousel memory Facit ECM 64 from Facit (2010)

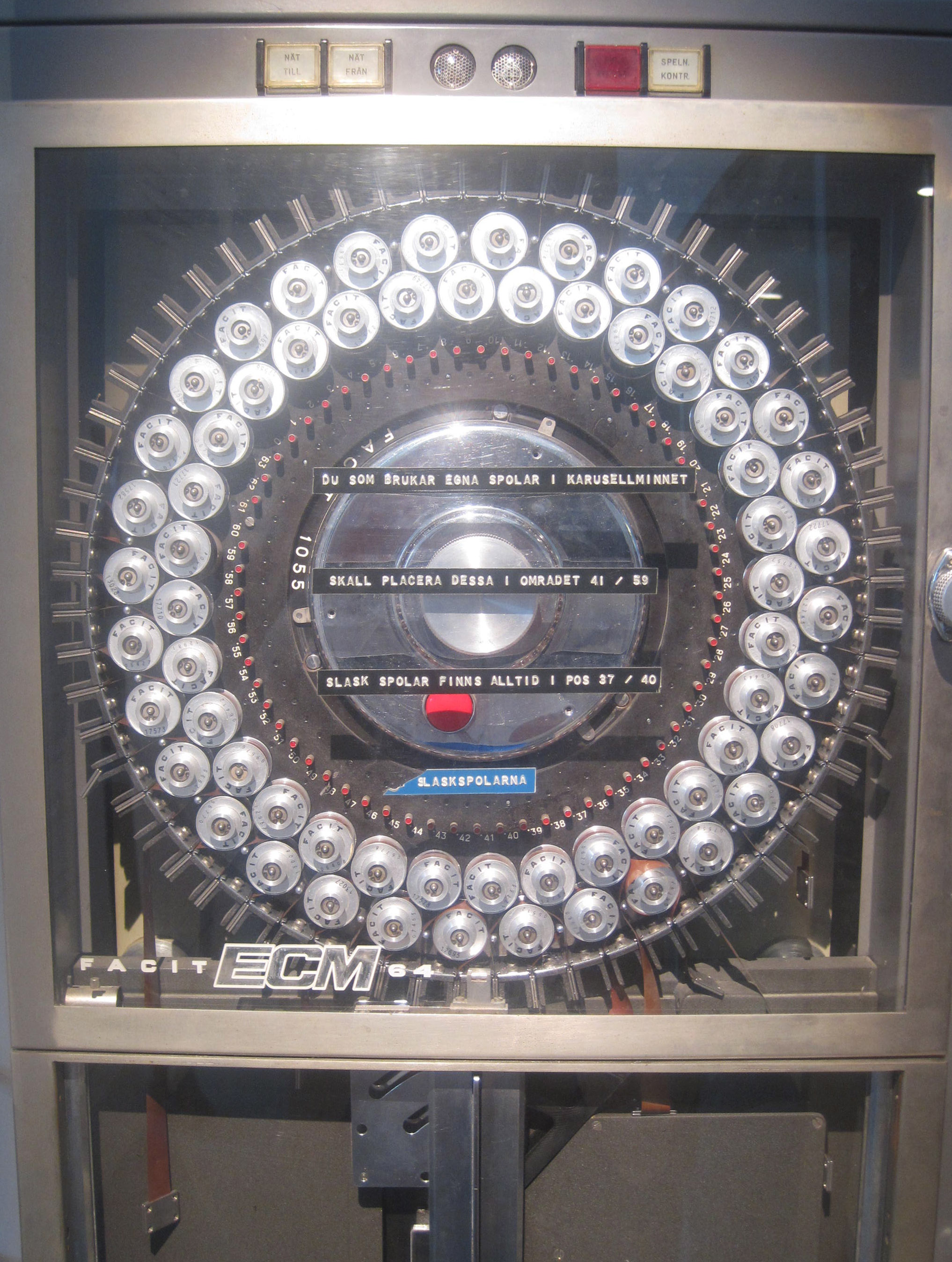
Carousel memory for SMIL, now at the "Teknikens och sjöfartens hus" in Malmö, Sweden (2013)

Carousel memory is a type of secondary storage for computers, which was created by Swedish computer engineers Erik Stemme and Gunnar Stenudd. It was first shown at an exhibition in Paris in 1958.

== Description ==
The FACIT ECM 64, manufactured by Swedish company Facit AB, is a prototype of carousel memory. To avoid having a single, long magnetic tape, it instead has 64 small rolls of 9 meters each, with 1.6-cm wide tape on each roll, divided into eight channels per roll. The tape speed is 5 m/s. To read a particular roll, the carousel rotates so the desired roll ends up at the bottom. A counterweight sits at the free end of the tape, and facilitates the roll in moving out and down into a mechanism with a read-and-write head. The tape is then rewound. The average seek time is 2 seconds and the storage space is 2560 kilobytes. The control system is operated by transistors. Both the carousel and individual spools are replaceable.

The magnetic tape is a 5/8-inch (1.6 cm) wide and 0.05 mm thick Mylar 3M Co type 188.The storage density is specified to 8 bits/mm, and the access head is capable of simultaneous read/write operations. The power requirement is three-phase 380 volts 50 Hz with 300 W when in standby and 750 W when active. Signaling for data uses eight parallel -20 V to 0 V 5 μs pulses.

Peak transfer speed is 182,044 bits/s, using eight parallel lines and thus 22,756 bits/s per line.

The first delivery of the Facit EDB 3 computer was in 1958 (to ASEA in Västerås) used the carousel memory Facit ECM 64.

== See also ==
- BESK, Sweden's first electronic computer, also developed by Erik Stemme
- Exatron Stringy Floppy, 1978 endless tape drive
- IBM 2321 Data Cell
- Karlqvist gap, calculation of magnetic field in ferromagnetic layer
- Rotronics Wafadrive, 1984 endless tape drive
- ZX Microdrive, 1983 endless tape drive
