= Conny Palm =

Swedish electrical engineer and statistician

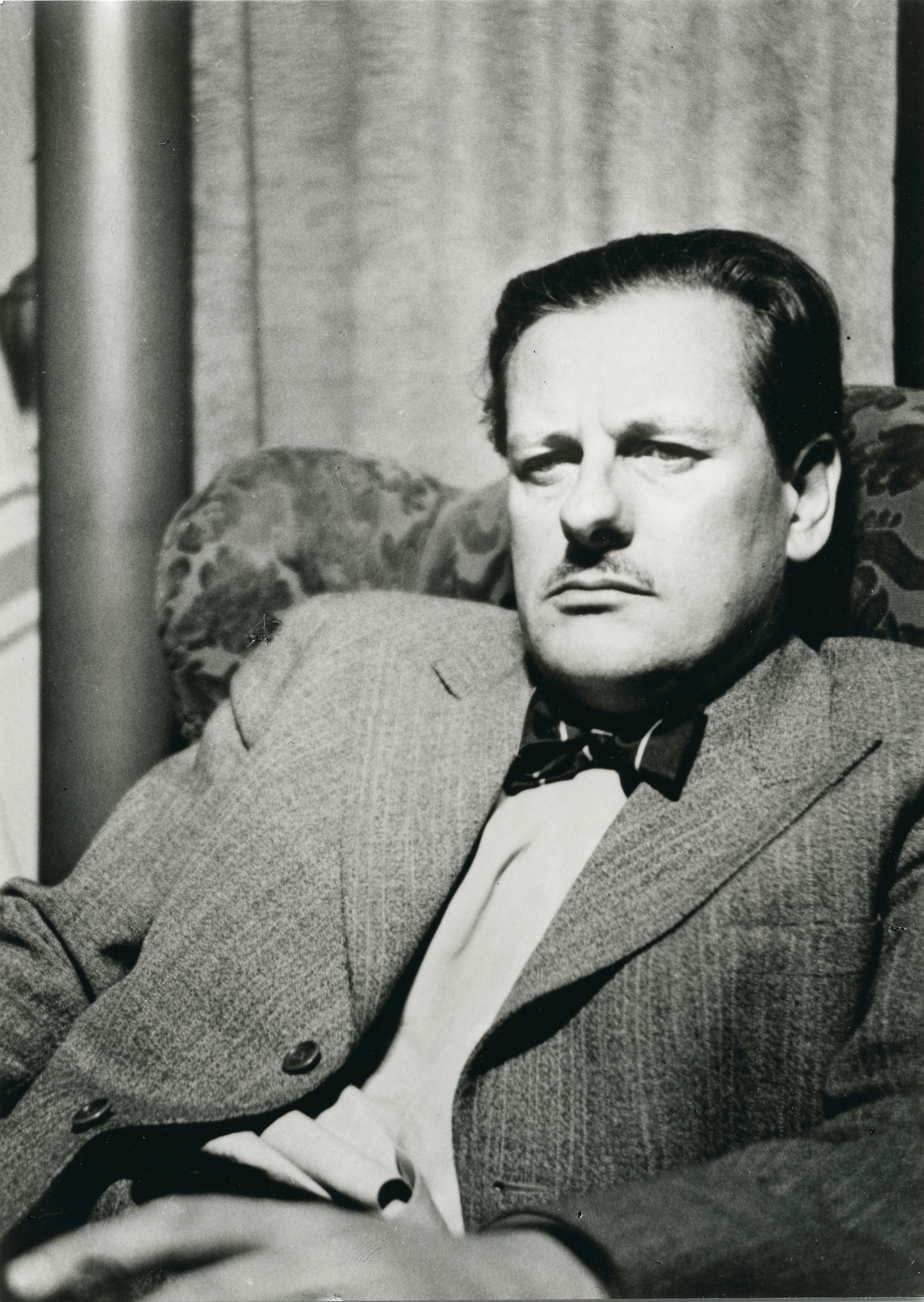
- Born: May 31, 1907; Stockholm, Sweden
- Died: December 27, 1951 (aged 44); Stockholm, Sweden
- Education: Royal Institute of Technology
- Scientific career
- Institutions: Swedish Board for Computing Machinery; Ericsson
- Doctoral advisor: Håkan Sterky

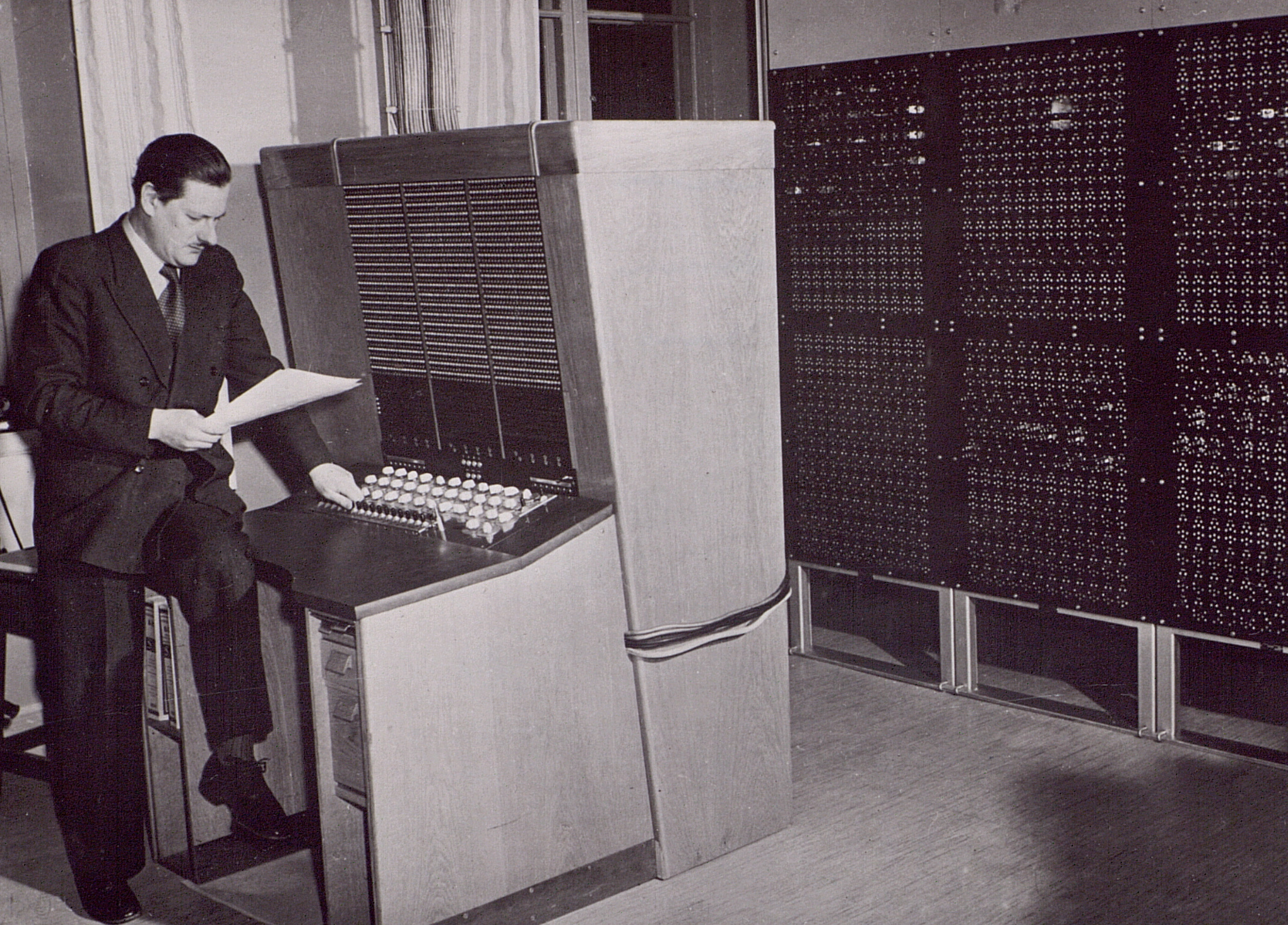
Palm and BARK

Conrad "Conny" Rudolf Agaton Palm (May 31, 1907 – December 27, 1951) was a Swedish electrical engineer and statistician, known for several contributions to teletraffic engineering and queueing theory.

== Education and career ==
Palm enrolled at the School of Electrical Engineering at the Royal Institute of Technology in Stockholm in 1925, being awarded his M.Sc. (1940) and Ph.D. (1943) on a dissertation entitled Intensitätsschwankungen im Fernsprechverkehr (Intensity Fluctuations in Telephone Traffic). Palm's work was also joint with L. M. Ericsson, cooperating with Christian Jacobæus. He attended Harald Cramér's queueing theory group, met William Feller (1937). Later, Palm was in the Swedish Board for Computing Machinery (Matematikmaskinnämnden), where he led the project that developed the first Swedish computer, the BARK (1947–51), informally referred to as CONIAC (Conny [Palm] Integrator And Calculator). He was adjunct professor in telecommunications at Royal Institute of Technology as well.

Professor Håkan Sterky, who was Palm's thesis advisor, has characterised Palm as a bohemian and a brilliant statistician. He had started his research before he graduated, which seemed to be due to a lack of interest for some undergraduate courses rather than the level of difficulty of the courses. To apply pressure on him, it was finally agreed that his monthly salary from Ericsson would only be paid out if he had passed one of his remaining undergraduate exam that month. Sterky related how Palm would typically show up a few days before pay day wishing to sit for an oral exam.

== Books ==
- Intensity variations in telephone traffic. North-Holland. 1988. ISBN 0-444-70472-8. Book edition of Ph.D. thesis of 1943, translated from German to English by Christian Jacobæus.

== See also ==
- Palm calculus
- Palm–Khintchine theorem
