= Nobelinstitut =

Nobelinstitut is a term for a number of scientific institutes created in the various institutions that appoint laureates of the various Nobel Prizes. The nobel institutes are primarily intended to support the Nobel Committees in their efforts to review proposals submitted for prize winners. They originally intended to also work as independent research institutes in their field, but this role is now of less importance. The opportunity for the prize-awarding institutions to set up the Nobel Institutes was included in the Nobel Foundation original foundation statutes. The establishment of such institutions was however not written in the will of Alfred Nobel. Å.G. Ekstrand meant that the idea probably came from the chemist Lars Fredrik Nilson.
