= ORACLE (computer) =

Early computer built by the Oak Ridge National Laboratory

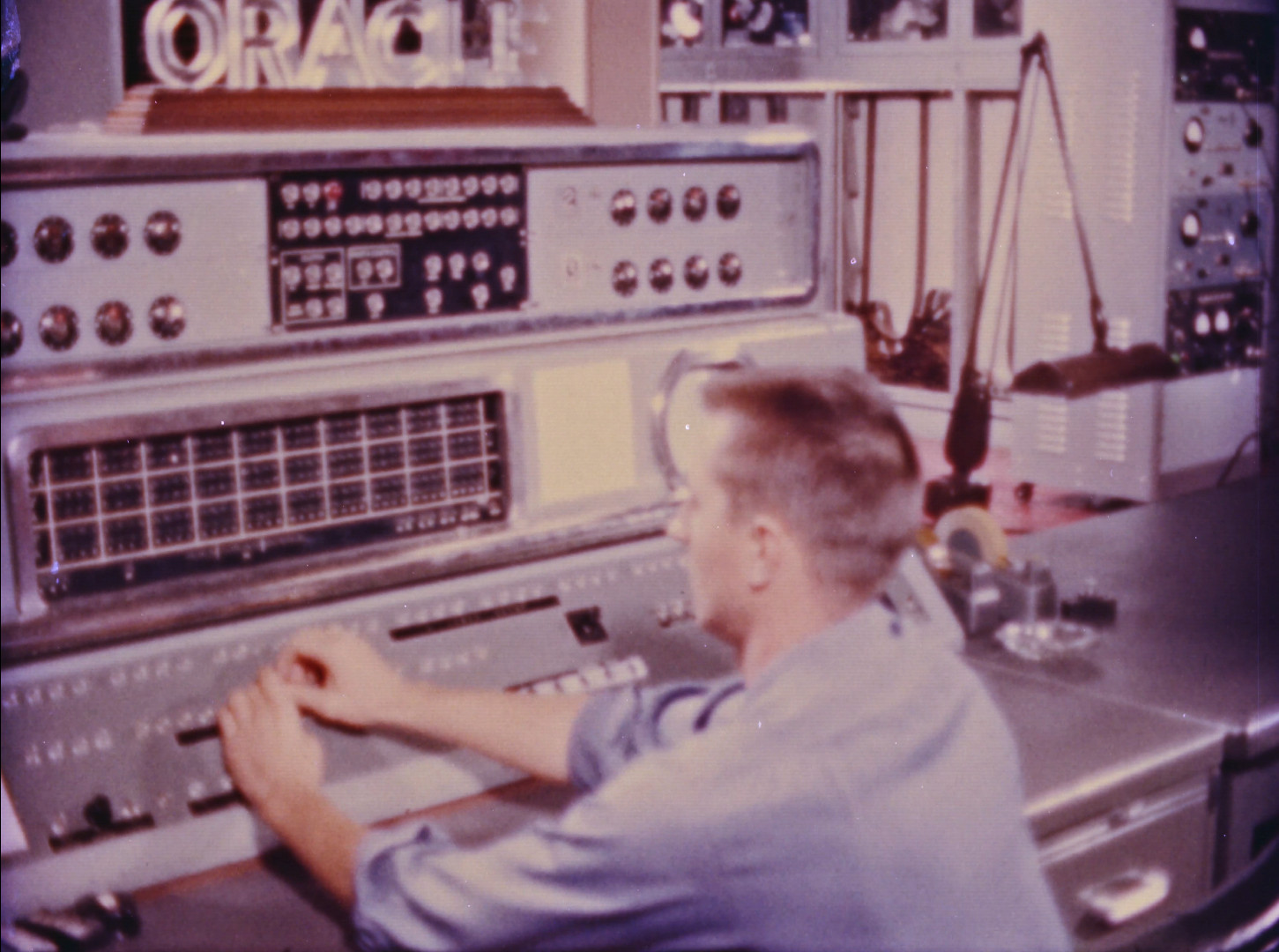
The ORACLE being used to design the nuclear reactor core of the APPR-1 reactor

The ORACLE, or Oak Ridge Automatic Computer and Logical Engine, was an early stored-program electronic digital computer built jointly by Argonne National Laboratory and Oak Ridge National Laboratory in the early 1950s. Based on the IAS architecture developed by John von Neumann at the Institute for Advanced Study in Princeton, it was fabricated at Argonne under subcontract for use at Oak Ridge, where it was installed and operated until the early 1960s. Its name was chosen as an allusion to the oracles of Greek mythology.

== Background ==
Following the establishment of a Mathematics and Computing Section at Oak Ridge in 1947 under the mathematical biophysicist Alston Scott Householder, the laboratory began surveying available computer designs for its nuclear-aircraft reactor calculations and other scientific work. Householder visited Howard Aiken's Harvard Mark I project, the ENIAC team at the Aberdeen Proving Ground, and several commercial manufacturers including General Electric, Raytheon, Reeves Instrument and the Institute for Advanced Study, before concluding that Oak Ridge should commission its own machine of the von Neumann type.

In 1949 Argonne National Laboratory, under Norman Hilberry, Frank Hoyt and Donald Flanders, had already decided to build a copy of the IAS machine for its own reactor computations. When Householder decided in 1950 that Oak Ridge needed a similar machine, he opted to subcontract the work to Argonne, whose engineering group already had the relevant experience. The second machine was designated the Oak Ridge Automatic Computer and Logical Engine; in overall architecture it followed the IAS design, but its engineering used faster circuits and smaller cathode-ray tubes for memory, with twice the storage capacity of the IAS prototype.

== Design ==
ORACLE was built around vacuum tubes, with diodes for logic and a small number of transistors in later subsystems. Its main memory used Williams tubes, originally configured for 1,024 words of 40 bits each and later doubled to 2,048 words. Auxiliary storage was provided by magnetic tape, and output devices included an on-line cathode-ray tube plotter, a graphic recorder and an electric typewriter. Input was via paper tape, which proved to be a recurring source of failure as the tape was prone to breakage during high-speed reads.

Reported instruction timings included an addition time of 70 microseconds, multiplication times in the range of 370 to 590 microseconds, and a division time of 590 microseconds; these figures included a memory access time of approximately 62 microseconds. As with other one-off machines of the period, ORACLE could not directly exchange programs with other computers, including other IAS-derived designs.

== Construction and acceptance ==
ORACLE was fabricated at Argonne with assistance from Oak Ridge engineers. It passed its acceptance test in 1953 and was reported in the literature alongside other IAS-derived machines at the August 1953 Symposium on Large-Scale Digital Computing Machinery. The first program run on the machine after acceptance was a Givens eigenvalue routine written by the mathematician Wallace Givens, and by early 1954 the computer was in full operational use at Oak Ridge. At the time of commissioning, ORACLE was briefly the fastest and largest-memory computer in the world.

ORACLE replaced an earlier and more limited Oak Ridge installation, the USAF-Fairchild Special Purpose Electronic Computer (SPEC).

== Applications ==
ORACLE was used primarily for scientific computations in support of the laboratory's nuclear reactor and nuclear-aircraft programs. Householder's Mathematics Panel applied it to neutron transport, radiation shielding and reactor-physics problems, and it was reported that calculations that would have required two mathematicians using electric desk calculators roughly three years to complete could be performed on ORACLE in about twenty minutes.

Other early users included the Argonne thermodynamics group, which used the machine in studies of the thermodynamic and transport properties of water and water vapour in the critical region. From 1957 the machine was also used by the laboratory's Budget Office, with Hezz Stringfield and Ward Foster adapting it to handle Oak Ridge's annual budgeting and monthly financial accounting.

== Obsolescence and legacy ==
Described in later ORNL histories as one of the last "homemade" computers of the early atomic-energy laboratories, ORACLE became obsolete by the 1960s, by which point Oak Ridge had moved to leased and purchased commercial mainframes for its production computing. Its early use nonetheless established computing as a standard tool at the laboratory, and ORACLE is conventionally counted among the small group of IAS-derived machines (alongside AVIDAC, MANIAC I, ILLIAC I, JOHNNIAC and others) that propagated von Neumann's architecture to the major American research centres in the early 1950s.

== See also ==
- AVIDAC
- IAS machine
- List of vacuum-tube computers
- MANIAC I
- ILLIAC I
