= GEORGE (computer) =

Computer built in 1957 by Argonne National Laboratory

GEORGE was an early computer built in 1957 by Argonne National Laboratory, was based on the IAS architecture developed by John von Neumann. (The name "GEORGE" is apparently not an acronym. It may have been derived from the sentence, "Let George do it," which was said when a person did not want to do something himself). As with almost all computers of its era, it was a one-of-a-kind machine that could not exchange programs with mother computers (even other IAS machines).
