= IAS machine =

First electronic computer to be built at the Institute for Advanced Study

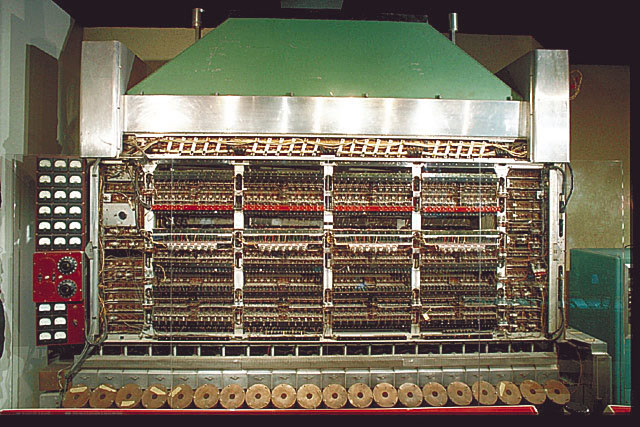
- The IAS machine on display at the Smithsonian Institution
- Developer: John von Neumann
- Manufacturer: Institute for Advanced Study (IAS)
- Released: June 10, 1952; 74 years ago
- Lifespan: 1952–1958
- CPU: 1,700 vacuum tubes
- Memory: 1,024 words (5.1 kilobytes) (Williams tubes)
- Weight: 1,000 pounds (450 kg)

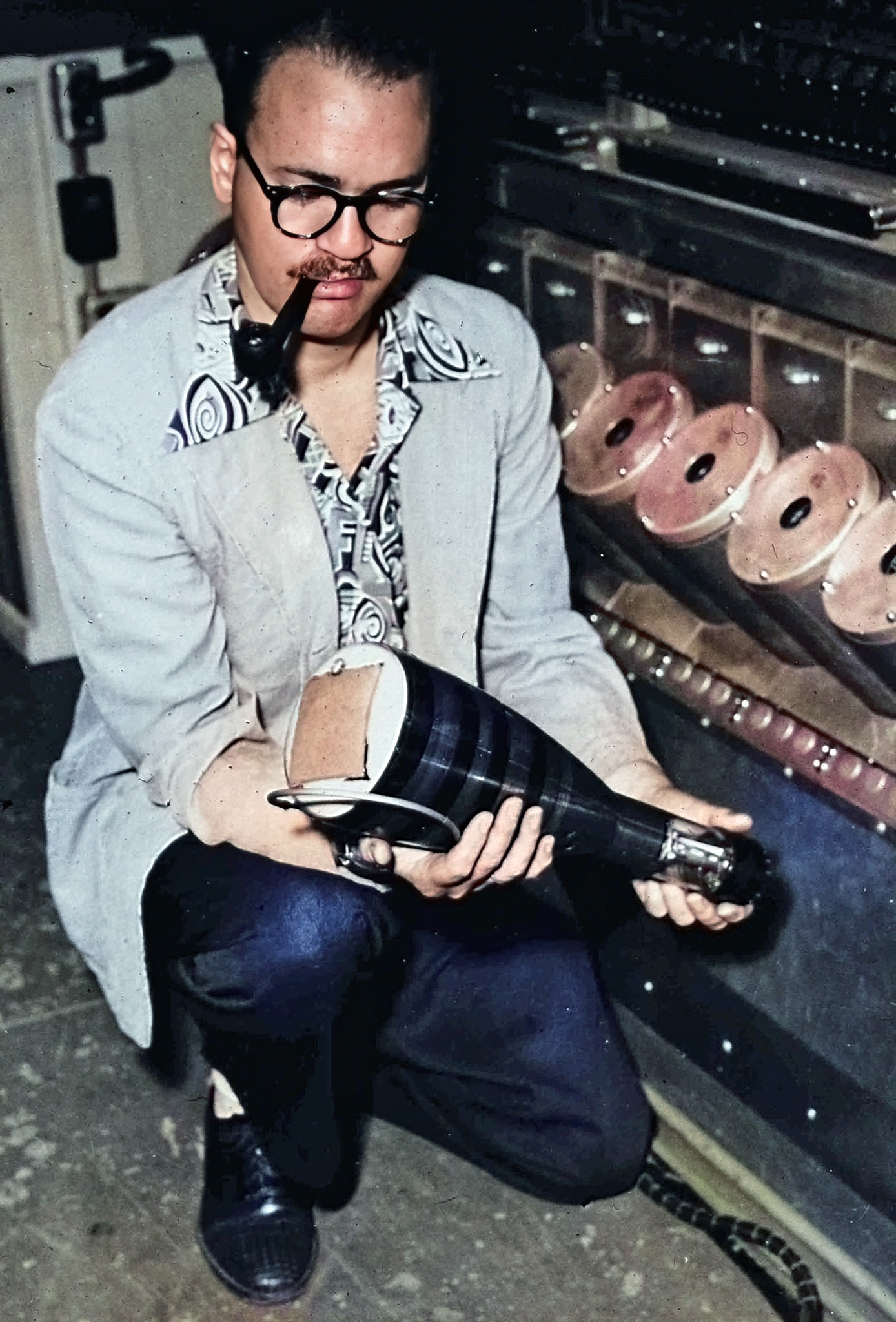
James Pomerene working on the IAS machine

The IAS machine was the first electronic computer built at the Institute for Advanced Study (IAS) in Princeton, New Jersey. It is sometimes called the von Neumann machine, since the paper describing its design was edited by John von Neumann, a mathematics professor at both Princeton University and IAS. The computer was built under his direction, starting in 1946 and finished in 1951. The general organization is called von Neumann architecture, even though it was both conceived and implemented by others. The computer is in the collection of the Smithsonian National Museum of American History but is not currently on display.

== History ==
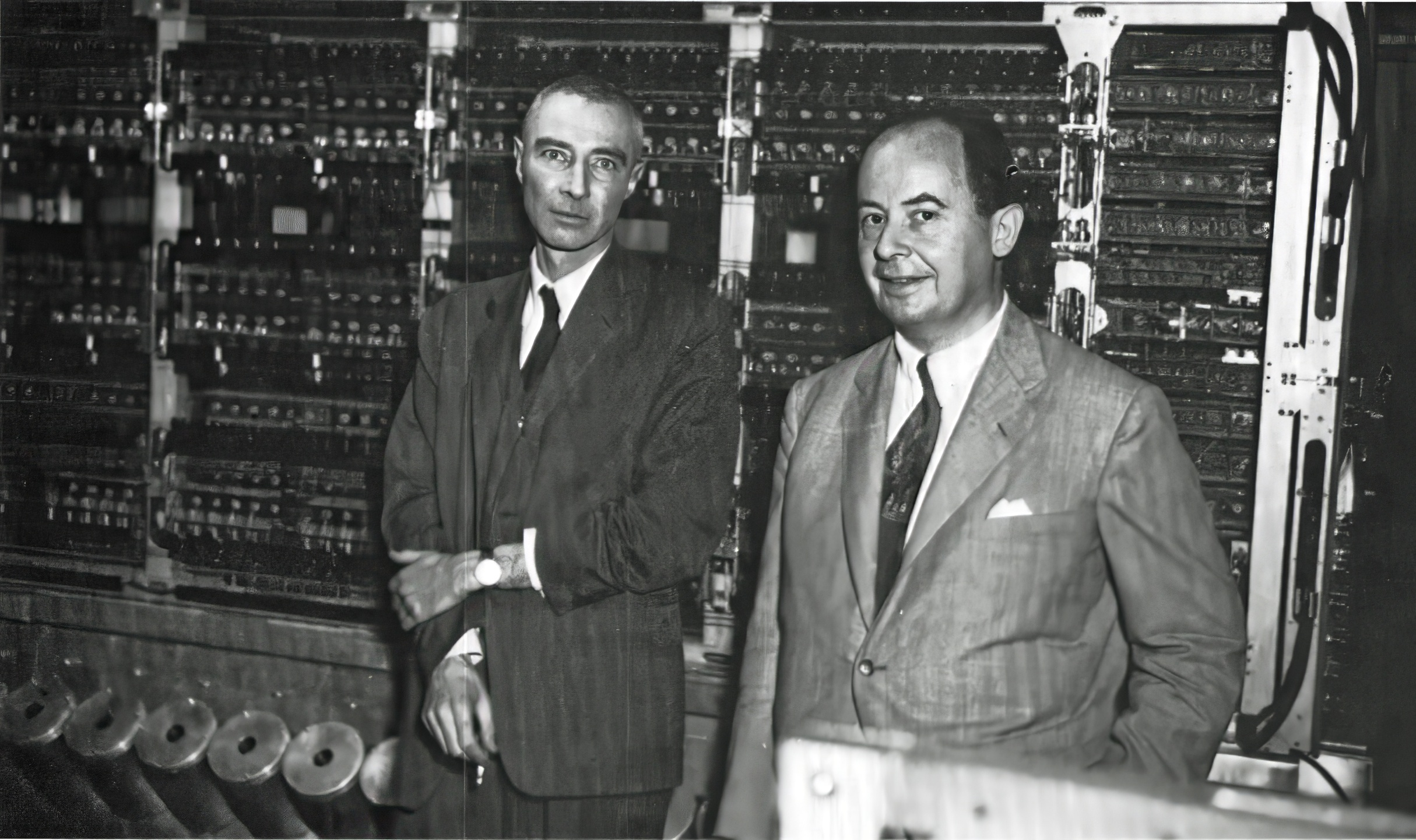
J. Robert Oppenheimer and John von Neumann in front of the IAS machine, 1952

In 1944 summer, John von Neumann met Herman Goldstine, a computer architect and a principal investigator of the ENIAC machine. In this meeting, Goldstine presented the ENIAC project to von Neumann. As the result of this meeting, von Neumann wrote a memo called First Draft of a Report on the EDVAC as the proposed IAS computer project. Goldstine typed the report and made a distribution on June 25, 1945. Von Neumann invited Goldstine to join the IAS project in early 1946, as the assistant director and later the director of the project. Arthur Burks, a senior engineer of the ENIAC project came with Goldstine to work in the IAS project. In early summer of 1946, Julian Bigelow was hired as chief engineer, and three other earlier engineers were James H. Pomerene, Ralph J. Slutz, and Willis Ware. After then, more engineers worked in the IAS computer project, including George W. Brown, Hewitt Crane, Gerald Estrin, and others. The machine was in limited operation in the summer of 1951 and fully operational on June 10, 1952. It was in operation until July 15, 1958.

== Description ==
The IAS machine was a binary computer with a 40-bit word, storing two 20-bit instructions in each word. The memory was 1,024 words (5 kilobytes in modern terminology). Negative numbers were represented in two's complement format. It had two general-purpose registers available: the Accumulator (AC) and Multiplier/Quotient (MQ). It used 1,700 vacuum tubes (triode types: 6J6, 5670, 5687, a few diodes: type 6AL5, 150 pentodes to drive the memory CRTs, and 41 CRTs (type: 5CP1A): 40 used as Williams tubes for memory plus one more to monitor the state of a memory tube). The memory was originally designed to use 40 RCA Selectron vacuum tubes, each of which was to have a capacity of 4,096 bits. Problems with the development of these complex tubes forced the switch to Williams tubes. The IAS machine was the first binary computer to process all of the bits of a word in parallel.

It weighed about 1,000 pounds (450 kg).

It was an asynchronous machine, meaning that there was no central clock regulating the timing of the instructions. One instruction started executing when the previous one finished. Addition took 40 microseconds, multiplication took 670 microseconds, and division took 1,070 microseconds. Storing the result took an additional 30 microseconds.

Although some claim the IAS machine was the first design to mix programs and data in a single memory, that had been implemented four years earlier by the 1948 Manchester Baby. The Soviet MESM also became operational prior to the IAS machine.

Von Neumann showed how the combination of instructions and data in one memory could be used to implement loops, by modifying branch instructions when a loop was completed, for example. The requirement that instructions, data and input/output be accessed via the same bus later came to be known as the Von Neumann bottleneck.

== IAS machine derivatives ==
Plans for the IAS machine were widely distributed to any schools, businesses, or companies interested in computing machines, resulting in the construction of several derivative computers referred to as "IAS machines", although they were not software compatible.

Some of these "IAS machines" were:

- AVIDAC (Argonne National Laboratory)
- BESK (Stockholm)
- BESM (Moscow)
- Circle Computer (Hogan Laboratories, Inc.), 1954
- CYCLONE (Iowa State University)
- DASK (Regnecentralen, Copenhagen 1958)
- GEORGE (Argonne National Laboratory)
- IBM 701 (19 installations)
- ILLIAC I (University of Illinois at Urbana–Champaign)
  - MUSASINO-1 (Musashino, Tokyo, Japan)
- JOHNNIAC (RAND)
- MANIAC I (Los Alamos National Laboratory)
- MISTIC (Michigan State University)
- ORACLE (Oak Ridge National Laboratory)
- ORDVAC (Aberdeen Proving Ground)
- PERM (Munich)
- SARA (SAAB)
- SEAC (Washington, D.C.)
- SILLIAC (University of Sydney)
- SMIL (Lund University)
- TIFRAC (Tata Institute of Fundamental Research)
- WEIZAC (Weizmann Institute)

== See also ==
- Von Neumann architecture
- List of vacuum-tube computers
