= BESK =

Sweden's first electronic computer

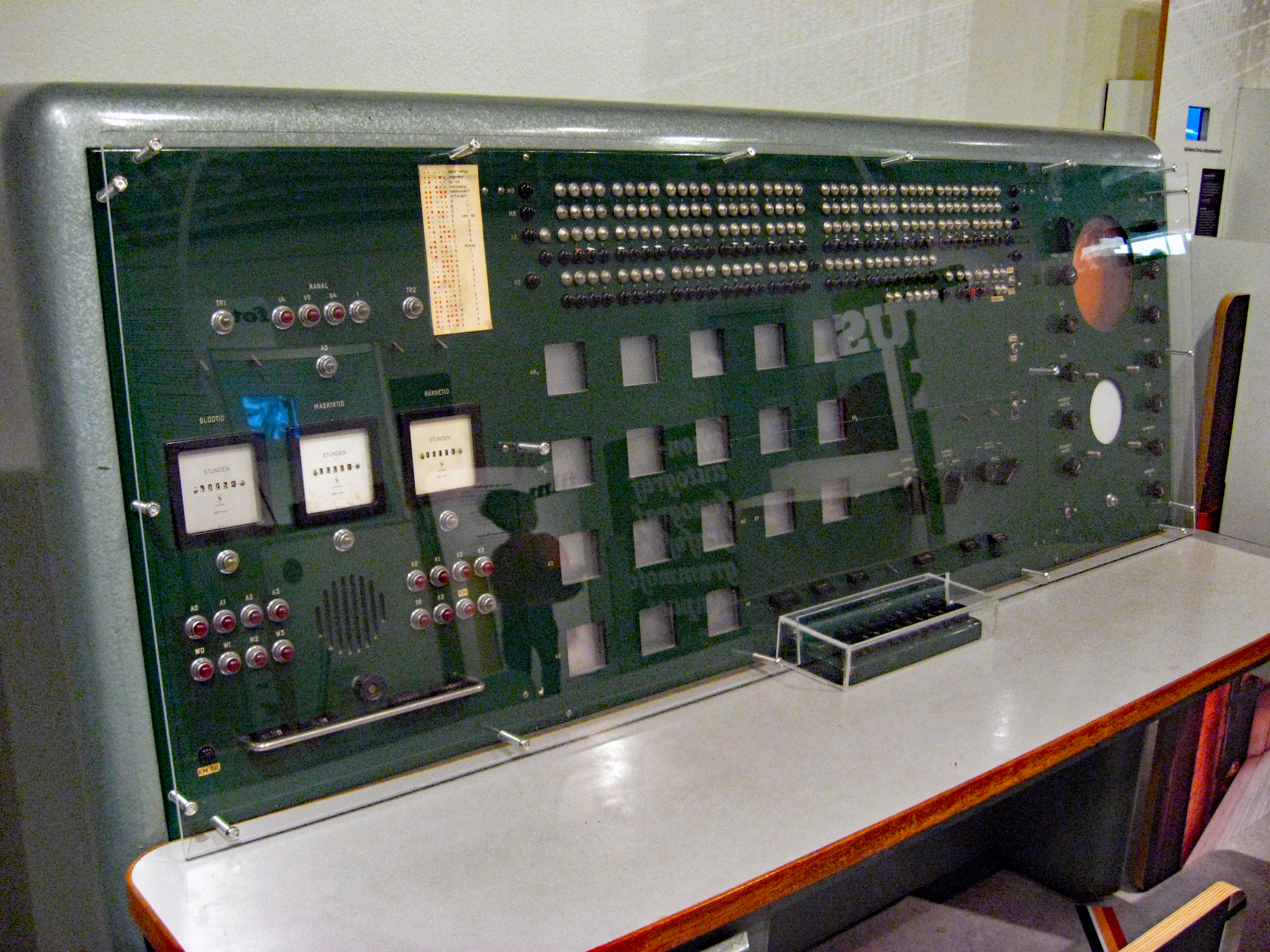
BESK control panel

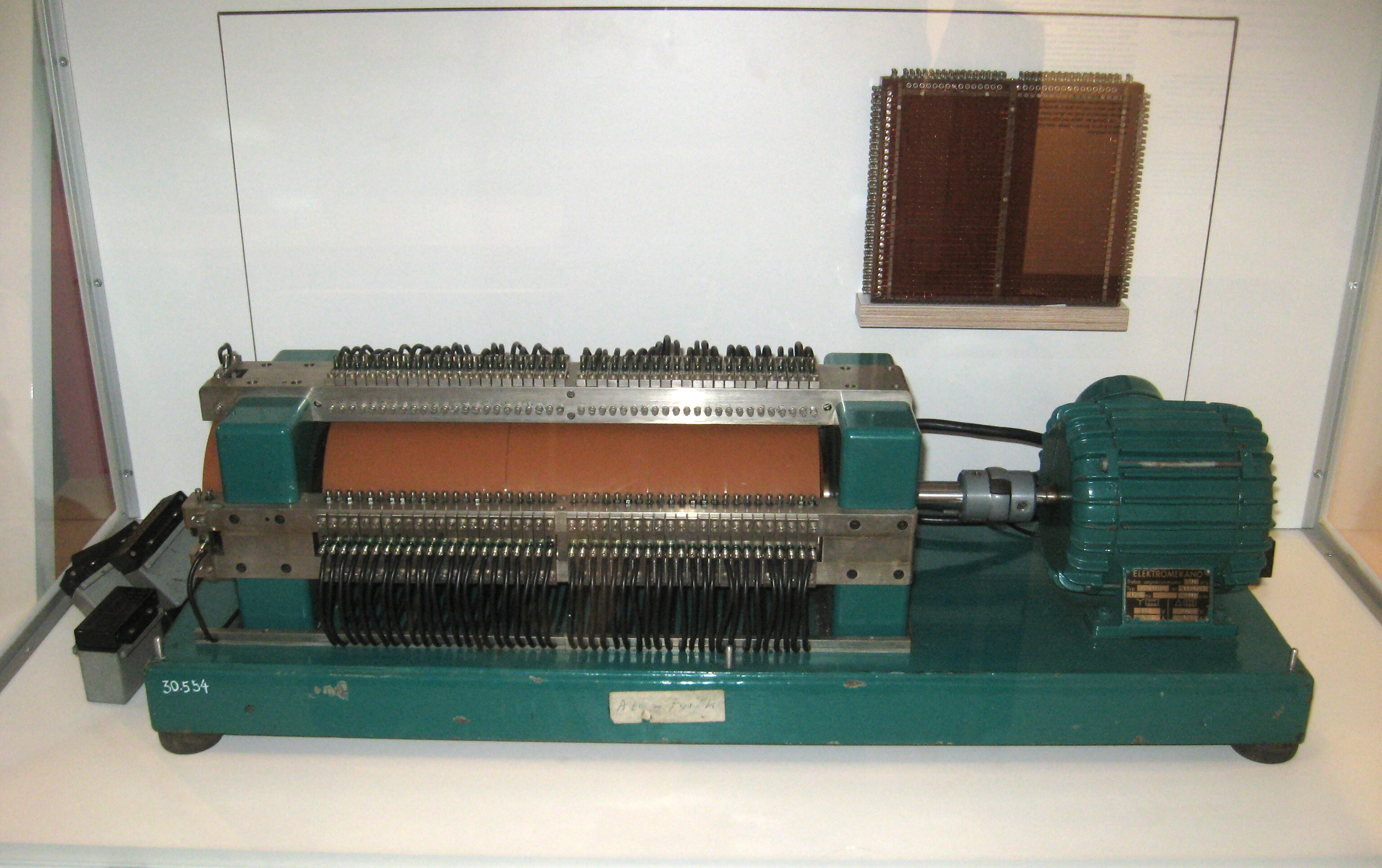
Drum memory (bottom) and core memory (upper right) for the BESK computer

BESK (Binär Elektronisk SekvensKalkylator, Swedish for "Binary Electronic Sequence Calculator") was Sweden's first electronic computer, using vacuum tubes instead of relays. It was developed by Matematikmaskinnämnden (Swedish Board for Computing Machinery) and for a short time it was the fastest computer in the world. The computer was completed in 1953 and was in use until 1966. The technology behind BESK was later continued with the FACIT EDB and FACIT EDB-3 machines, both software compatible with BESK. Non-compatible machines highly inspired by BESK were SMIL made for the University of Lund, SAABs räkneautomat SARA, "SAAB's calculating machine", and DASK made in Denmark.

BESK was developed by the Swedish Board for Computing Machinery (Matematikmaskinnämnden) a few years after the mechanical relay computer BARK (Binär Aritmetisk Relä-Kalkylator, Swedish for "Binary Arithmetic Relay Calculator"). The team was initially led by Conny Palm, who died in December 1951, after which Stig Comét took over. The hardware was developed by Erik Stemme. Gösta Neovius and Olle Karlqvist were responsible for architecture and instruction set. It was closely modeled on the IAS machine for which the design team had retrieved drawings during a scholarship to Institute for Advanced Study (IAS) and Massachusetts Institute of Technology, U.S.

During the development of the BESK magnetic drum memory, Olle Karlqvist discovered a magnetic phenomenon, which has been called the Karlqvist gap.

== Performance ==
BESK was a 40-bit machine; it could perform an addition in 56 μs and a multiplication took 350 μs. The electrostatic memory could store 512 words. The instruction length was 20 bits, so each word could store two instructions. BESK contained 2400 "radio tubes" (vacuum tubes) and 400 germanium diodes (so it was partly solid state). The power consumption was 15 kVA.

Initially an average runtime of 5 minutes was achieved before hardware problems appeared. In 1954 the system became more stable. Breakpoints were introduced to allow software to restart after hardware failures.

Originally BESK had a British Williams tube 512 word x 40 bit memory based on 40 cathode tubes, and eight spare tubes. The memory was from the beginning found to be insufficient and Carl-Ivar Bergman was given just a few weeks to build and install a ferrite core memory in 1956. To complete the work before the deadline they hired housewives with knitting experience to make the memory. One of the new memory bits did not work at first, but it was easily cut out and replaced.

== Usage ==
BESK was inaugurated on 1 April 1954 and handled weather data for Carl-Gustaf Rossby and the Swedish Meteorological and Hydrological Institute, statistics for the telecommunications service provider Televerket, wing profiles for the attack aircraft Saab Lansen, and road profiles for the road authority Vägverket. During the nights Swedish National Defence Radio Establishment (FRA) used BESK for cracking encryption of radio messages (by Per-Erik Persson et al.). BESK was also used for calculations for the Swedish nuclear energy industry, for example Monte Carlo simulations of neutron spectrum (by Per-Erik Persson et al.), and for the Swedish nuclear weapon program, but most of those calculations were done by SMIL. In 1957 Hans Riesel used BESK to discover a Mersenne prime with 969 digits - the largest prime known at the time.

SAAB rented computer time on the BESK to (probably, much was secret) make calculations of the strength of the Saab Lansen attack aircraft. In the fall of 1955 SAAB thought the capacity was insufficient and started working on SAABs räkneautomat SARA, "SAAB's calculating machine", which was going to be twice as fast as BESK. Some former SARA employees went to Facit and worked with the FACIT EDB.

In the spring of 1956, eighteen of the BESK developers were hired by office equipment manufacturer Facit and housed in an office at Karlavägen 62 in Stockholm, where they started to build copies of BESK called Facit EDB (models 1, 2, and 3), led by Carl-Ivar Bergman. A total of nine machines were built, of which four were used internally by Facit Electronics and five were sold to customers. On 1 July 1960 Facit Electronics, then with 135 employees, moved to Solna, just north of Stockholm.

In 1960 BESK was used to create an animation of a car driving down a planned highway from the driver's perspective. This was one of the earliest computer animations ever made. The short clip was broadcast on Swedish national television on 9 November 1961.

== Trivia ==
"Besk" is Swedish for the taste "bitter". Bäsk is also the name of a traditional bitters made from distilled alcohol seasoned with the herb Artemisia absinthium L. local to the province of Skåne, in which Lund is located. Reportedly this was an intentional and unnoticed pun after officials denied usage of the name CONIAC (Conny [Palm] Integrator And Calculator, compare Cognac and ENIAC) for the predecessor BARK.

== See also ==
- BARK - Binär Aritmetisk Relä-Kalkylator - Sweden's first computer.
- Elsa-Karin Boestad-Nilsson, a programmer on BARK and BESK
- SMIL - SifferMaskinen I Lund (The Number Machine in Lund)
- History of computing hardware
- List of vacuum tube computers
