= Swedish Board for Computing Machinery =

Swedish government agency

The Swedish Board for Computing Machinery (Swedish: Matematikmaskinnämnden, MMN) was a Swedish government agency which built Sweden's first computers: BARK and BESK.

A governmental study into the need for computing machinery in Sweden had been conducted in 1947 by initiative of the Royal Swedish Academy of Engineering Sciences and the Naval Procurement Agency. The study recommended the immediate purchase of computing machinery from the United States and a budget of 2 million SEK was allocated for the purpose.

The Swedish Board for Computing Machinery was established on November 26, 1948, to handle the purchase. The Academy of Engineering Sciences had initiated some activities already in 1947 by sending five young engineers and scientists to research groups in the United States to study the ongoing activities. Two were sent to John von Neumann at Princeton, two to Howard H. Aiken at Harvard, and one to IBM.

When it turned out that it would not be possible for Sweden to get export licences for US-built computers, the activities of MMN quickly changed into constructing rather than importing computing machinery. The relay-based BARK, operational in 1950, was built as an interim measure. This was followed by the vacuum tube-based BESK, operational in 1954, which for a short time was the fastest computer in the world.

In 1963, MMN was closed down. At that time, the Swedish government felt that there was no need for further computer development by a government agency, as computers were now an industrial product. MMN had never received funds to launch developments of a new generation of transistor-based computers, so when they were closed down, they were no longer in the forefront of computer development. Some years before, FACIT had recruited many key employees from MMN to its new division for electronic computers. FACIT EDB that were completed in 1957 was essentially a transistor-based version of BESK.
