= AVIDAC =

Early computer built by Argonne National Laboratory

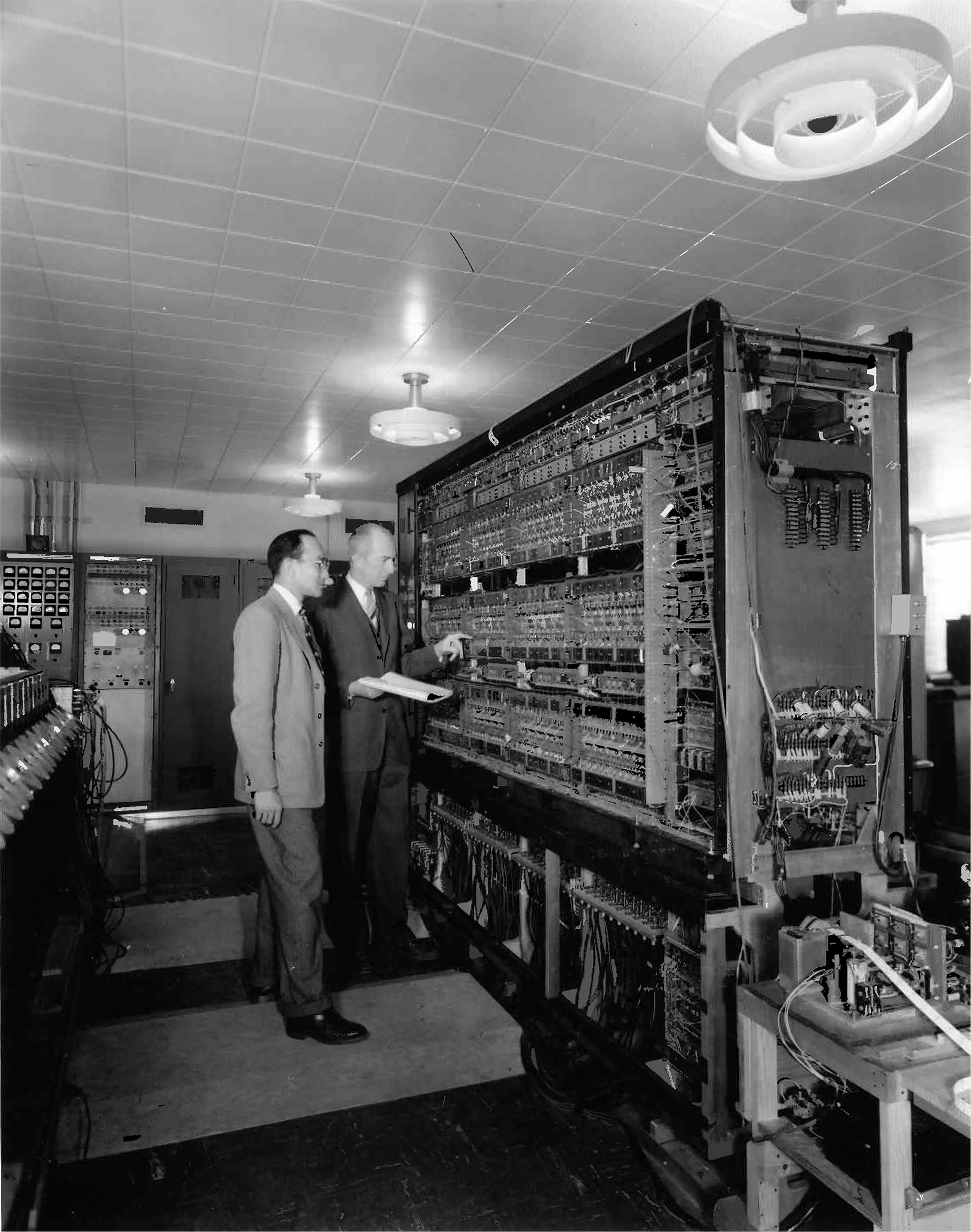
AVIDAC in 1953

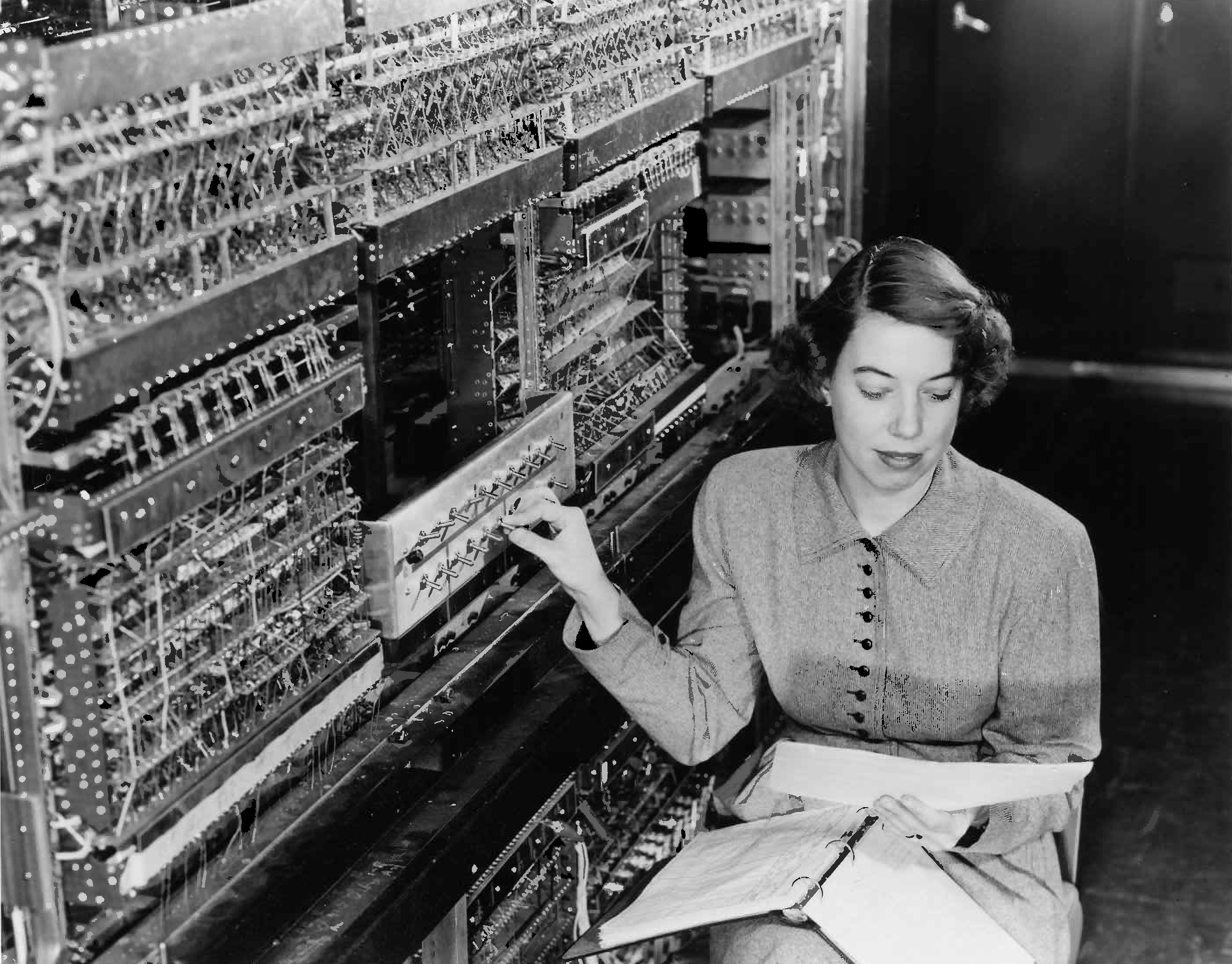
AVIDAC

The AVIDAC or Argonne Version of the Institute's Digital Automatic Computer, an early computer built by Argonne National Laboratory, was partially based on the IAS architecture developed by John von Neumann. It was built by the Laboratory's Physics Division for $250,000 and began operations on January 28, 1953.

As with almost all computers of its era, it was a one-of-a-kind machine that could not exchange programs with other computers (even other IAS machines).

== See also ==
- List of vacuum-tube computers
