= Facit =

Industrial corporation and manufacturer based in Åtvidaberg, Sweden

Old brick advert of Facit-Odhner, New York. (Facit-Odhner was a sub-sidiary of Facit)

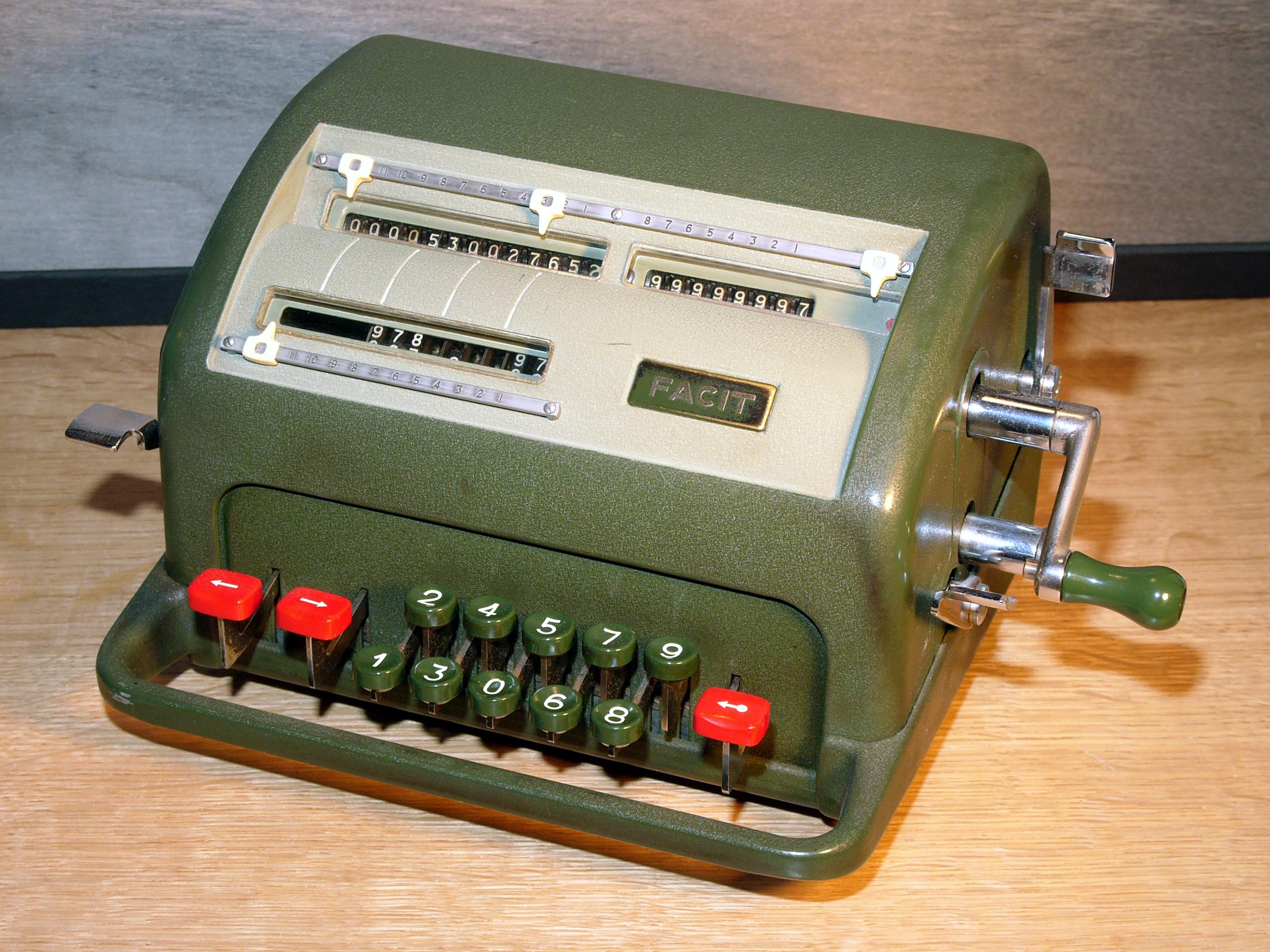
Facit calculating machine, 1954

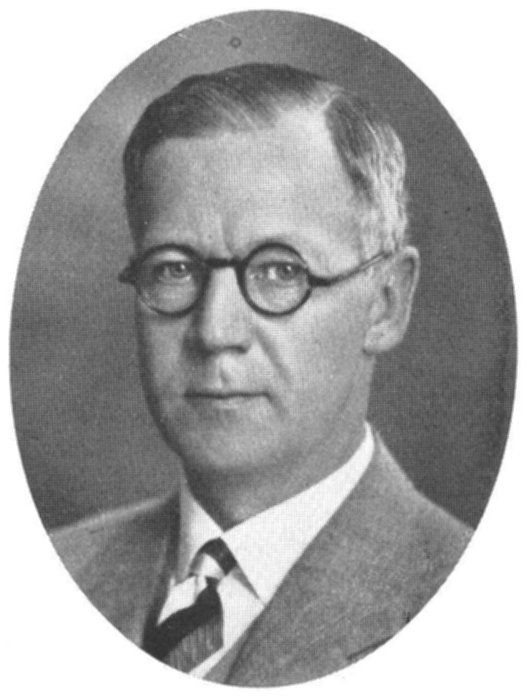
Elof Ericsson (1887–1961), founder in 1922 of AB Åtvidabergs Industrier. Photo from 1937.

Facit AB was a Swedish manufacturer of office products and furniture. It was based in Åtvidaberg, Sweden, and founded in 1922 as AB Åtvidabergs Industrier. Facit AB, a manufacturer of mechanical calculators, was incorporated into the corporation the same year. In 1932, the first ten-digit calculator was manufactured by Åtvidaberg Industries, it was named FACIT and became a great success.

In the 1950s, Facit introduced a mascot character, a short, smiling man with a wizard's cap called "Facit Man". The character first appeared in the instruction manuals for Facit's calculators. The character lasted into the 1970s.

By the early 1960s the corporation had a total of 8,000 employees with subsidiaries in over 100 countries, and the subsidiary Facit had come to dominate the business of the corporation. In 1965 the entire corporation changed its name to Facit AB. The following year, it acquired its competitor Addo, which was maintained as a separate subsidiary. Under the popular leadership of Gunnar Ericsson, Facit focused increasingly on its mechanical calculators, branding, marketing and global expansion. This strategy was referred to as "The New Deal". Throughout the 1960s Facit experienced an increased growth and a high profitability.

While mechanical calculators were Facit's main product, they produced other office and early computing products like typewriters, paper tape punches, and floppy disk devices.

However, electronic calculators were rapidly improving in performance and gained larger market shares over time. In 1965, 4,000 digital calculators were sold globally. The next year, the same figure had reached 25,000 and in 1967 they accounted for 15 percent of the market.

Facit sought to handle this disruptive threat by collaborating with the Japanese firm Hayakawa (Sharp). The electronic calculators were manufactured in Japan and during 1965–67 Facit had exclusive rights to sell them through its global market organization under the Facit brand. As Hayakawa started to build its own global sales organization, the relationship between the two companies became increasingly strained.

In 1970, the company had reached its peak with more than 14,000 employees worldwide. In 1971, modern Japanese-made calculators started to seriously disrupt the industry, instantly making Facit's mechanical calculators obsolete. As a result, Facit went out of business virtually overnight. The general view on this failure is that Facit met its demise as a result of refusing to acknowledge the superiority of modern calculators, as well as an unwillingness to adapt and change accordingly, to meet the new demands from the market. Other reasons for this have been mentioned as well: for instance the inability to consolidate the R&D functions of acquired companies as well as limited R&D resources due to the relatively small size of Facit compared to its American counterparts. In Swedish business theory, this is called "the Facit trap" (Swedish: Facitfällan), inability to follow a technology shift, even if skill and money is available. Also in the mid 1970s Facit's designs were cloned in products such as the VK-2 in the Soviet Union.

Facit was sold to Electrolux in 1973. In 1983 it was again sold to Ericsson, and the production of a microcomputer was initiated. Over four years, the Facit DTC 6500 home computer became popular in Sweden, though it was actually an OEM version of the ABC 800 manufactured by Luxor AB. It offered some innovative solutions with a version of BASIC as a programming language. However, the venture was not profitable and it was terminated in 1988. Facit-Addo imported many other early microcomputers to Europe, for example the Sharp MZ series.

The company was subsequently divided between foreign owners. The remainder of the corporation known as Facit AB was finally terminated in 1998.
