= List of vacuum-tube computers =

First generation programmable computers

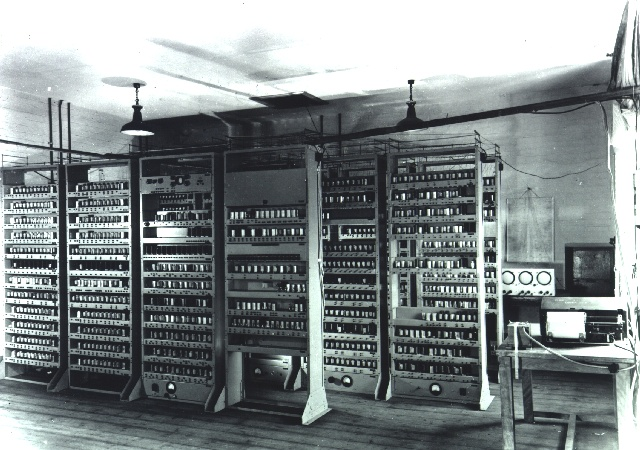
EDSAC

Vacuum-tube computers, now called first-generation computers, are programmable digital computers using vacuum-tube logic circuitry. They were preceded by systems using electromechanical relays and followed by systems built from discrete transistors. Often vacuum-tube computers made extensive use of solid-state ("crystal") diodes to perform AND and OR logic functions per diode-resistor logic (DRL) also diode–transistor logic (DTL), and only used vacuum tubes to amplify signals between stages or to construct elements such as flip-flops, counters, and registers. The solid-state diodes reduced the size and power consumption of the overall machine. Some later computers on the list had both vacuum tubes and transistors.

This list of vacuum-tube computers is sorted by date put into service, and notes the vacuum tube:Crystal diode semiconductor (VT:CD) ratio, e.g., "747 V : 10,500 D" for SEAC (computer):

Computer	Date	Units	VT:CD	Notes
Arthur Halsey Dickinson (IBM)	1939	1		Not programmable, executed addition and subtraction, the first electronic output (display)
Joseph Desch, NCR3566 (NCR)	1939	1		Not programmable, executed addition and subtraction, thyratron decades
Atanasoff–Berry Computer	1942	1		Not programmable, but could solve a system of linear equations.
Colossus	1943	10		The Mark II version was the first programmable (by switches and plug panels) special-purpose (cryptanalysis) electronic digital computer. It was used in breaking the German Lorenz cipher; and superseded the Heath Robinson (codebreaking machine). A working replica is demonstrated at The National Museum of Computing, Bletchley Park.
ENIAC	1945	1	18k : 0	First large-scale general-purpose programmable electronic digital computer. Built by the University of Pennsylvania's Moore School of Electrical Engineering for the U.S. Army's Ballistic Research Laboratory. Originally programmed by wiring together components, by April 1948, it had been converted to a form of stored-program operation. It was decimal in nature, not binary.
Manchester Baby	1948	1	550 : 0	First electronic stored-program computer, worked June 1948; prototype for the Mark 1. Working replica demonstrated daily in Manchester Museum of Science and Industry.
Manchester Mark 1	1949	1	4.1k : 0	Provided a computing service from April 1949. First index registers. Re-engineered 1951 as Ferranti Mark 1.
EDSAC	1949	1	3k : 0	First ran on 6 May 1949, and provided a computing service for Cambridge University until 1958. Working replica being built at The National Museum of Computing, Bletchley Park.
BINAC	1949	1	700 : 0	First stored-program computer to be sold, but it did not work for the customer.
CSIRAC	1949	1	2k : 0	Oldest surviving complete first-generation electronic computer — unrestored and non-functional.
SEAC	1950	1	1 : 14	First U.S. stored-program computer to become operational. Built by and for the U.S. National Bureau of Standards. Used solid-state diode circuits for its logic. Several computers were based on the SEAC design.
SWAC	1950	1	2.3k : 0	Built for the U.S.'s National Bureau of Standards, it had 2,300 vacuum tubes. It had 256 words (each of 37 bits) of memory, using Williams tubes
ERA Atlas	1950		2.7k : 0	Military version of Univac 1101; it used 2,700 vacuum tubes for its logic circuits.
MADDIDA	1950	6	1 : 17	Special-purpose digital computer for solving a system of differential equations. Forty-four integrators were implemented using a magnetic drum with six storage tracks. The interconnections of the integrators were specified by writing an appropriate pattern of bits onto one of the tracks.
Pilot ACE	1950	1	800 : 0	Based on a full-scale design by Alan Turing
Elliott 152	1950	1	1k : 0	Naval fire control computer, real-time control system, fixed program
Elliott 153	1950	1	1k : 0	GCHQ radio signal directional finding computer, based on the Elliott 152, with programs stored on a magnetic disk
Harvard Mark III	1951	1	1 : 0.3	It used 5,000 vacuum tubes, 1,500 crystal diodes and also ~2,000 relays.
Ferranti Mark 1	1951	9	4.1k : 0	First commercially available computer, based on Manchester Mark 1.
EDVAC	1951	1	1 : 2	The successor to ENIAC, and also built by the University of Pennsylvania's Moore School of Electrical Engineering for the U.S. Army's Ballistic Research Laboratory. One of the first stored-program computers to be designed, but its entry into service was delayed. EDVAC's design influenced a number of other computers.
Harwell Dekatron Computer (The "WITCH")	1951	1	959 : 0	Now officially the oldest original working computer in the world. It is frequently demonstrated at The National Museum of Computing, Bletchley Park.
Whirlwind	1951	1	1 : 1.9	Parallel logic, approx 5,000 vacuum tubes. This was the machine for which magnetic-core memory was developed; as soon as it was proven on the MTC, it replaced the unreliable MIT electrostatic memory. It was a bit-slice implementation with rows of relay racks (one bit per rack) packaged in a building.
UNIVAC I	1951	46	1 : 3.2	Mass-produced; 46 were made.
LEO I	1951	1	7k : 0	First computer for commercial applications. Built by the J. Lyons and Co. restaurant and bakery chain, based on the EDSAC design.
MESM	1951	1	6k : 0	First universally programmable computer in USSR, built near Kiev, used 6,000 vacuum tubes. Designed basically near to Von Neumann architecture but had two separate banks of memory - one for programs and another for data (Harvard architecture).
IAS machine	1951	1	2.3k : 0	Built at the Institute for Advanced Study (IAS), it was the basis of about 15 other computers. Sometimes called the von Neumann machine, since the design was described by John von Neumann (the Von Neumann architecture). It used 2,300 tubes (CPU + Memory + Power + I/O) of which 1,700 were CPU logic.
UNIVAC 1101	1951		1 : 0.9	Designed by ERA and publicly announced 1951 (Dec). The name "1101" is binary for 13, a reference to project "Task 13". It used 2,700 vacuum tubes and 2,385 crystal diodes.
HEC 1: APE(H)C	1951		1 : 2	Built by the British Tabulating Machine Company. Refined from the initial APEXC design by Andrew Donald Booth. HEC 1 can be seen at The National Museum of Computing, Bletchley Park.
HEC 1: APE(H)C	1952		800 : 0	Built by the Booth team
G1	1952		476 : 0	Built by the Max Planck Institute for Physics in Göttingen, esp. by Heinz Billing with ~100 Mechanical Relays
Remington Rand 409	1952	~1,000	2k : 0	Built by Remington Rand; it was a punched card calculator programmed by a plugboard.
ORDVAC	1952	1	2.8k : 0	Built by the University of Illinois for the Ballistic Research Laboratory and was a twin of the ILLIAC I
ILLIAC I	1952	1	2.8k : 0	Built by the University of Illinois in Urbana
MANIAC I	1952	1	2.4k : 0	Built at Los Alamos Scientific Laboratory and based on the IAS computer
IBM 701	1952	19	1 : 3.2	Built by IBM, also known as the Defense Calculator, based on the IAS computer
BESM-1	1952	1	1 : 3	Built in the Soviet Union.
Harvard Mark IV	1952	1	1 : 10	Built by Harvard University under the supervision of Howard Aiken for the United States Air Force.
Bull Gamma 3	1952	~1,200	1 : 20	Made by Compagnie des Machines Bull, one of the first mass produced electronic digital computers
TREAC	1953	1		Telecommunications Research Establishment Automatic Computer - Parallel computer developed at TRE Malvern, England
AVIDAC	1953	1		Based on the IAS computer
FLAC	1953	3		Design based on SEAC. Located at Patrick Air Force Base.
JOHNNIAC	1953	1		Built by the RAND Corporation, based on the IAS computer
MIDAC	1953	1		Built at the University of Michigan, the first at a university in the Midwest
MTC	1953	1		First computer to run with magnetic core memory and prove it to be practical. The core stack was then moved to Whirlwind, and this machine received a new core stack. It took over some research work from Whirlwind. It was a bit-slice implementation with each vertical column containing one bit of each register, and each horizontal row containing one register. It's military black crinkle-finish paint was considered boring and inspired a brighter, angular design for the TX-0. Originally referred to as Whirlwind IA or Whirlwind 1-1/2.
IBM 702	1953	14		Built by IBM for business computing
UNIVAC 1103	1953			Designed by Engineering Research Associates (ERA)
RAYDAC	1953	1		Built by Raytheon for Naval Air Missile Test Center
Strela computer	1953	7		Built in the Soviet Union
ARRA II	1953	2		First Dutch computer, built at MC (now CWI) in Amsterdam. FERTA was a copy built for Fokker.
Datatron	1954	~120		Scientific/commercial computer built by ElectroData Corporation
IBM 650	1954	~2,000		The world's first mass-produced computer
IBM 704	1954	123		The first mass-produced computer with floating-point arithmetic hardware for scientific use
IBM 705	1954			Mostly compatible with the IBM 702, for business use. There is one that is not in operating condition at Computermuseum München.
BESK	1954	1		Sweden's first computer, the fastest computer in the world for a brief time.
IBM NORC	1954	1		Built by IBM for the US Navy Bureau of Ordnance, it was the first supercomputer and the most powerful computer in the world for at least 2 years. 9,800 tubes in logic.
UNIVAC 1102	1954	3		A variation of the UNIVAC 1101 built for the US Air Force.
DYSEAC	1954	1		Built by the U.S. National Bureau of Standards as an improved version of SEAC. Mounted in a trailer van, making it the first computer to be transportable.
WISC	1954	1		Built by the University of Wisconsin–Madison
REAC 400 (C-400)	1955			In 1961, REAC was installed for $60,000 at University of Minnesota. General-purpose electronic analog computer.
CAB 2000	1955	4		First computer series from the French Société d'Electronique et d'Automatisme produced in several units.
CALDIC	1955	1		Designed to be inexpensive and simple to use; it used decimal arithmetic.
MOSAIC	1955	1	1 : 0.3	Second implementation of the ACE (Automatic Computing Engine) architecture after Pilot ACE.
English Electric DEUCE	1955	31		Commercial version of Pilot ACE
Zuse Z22	1955	55		An early commercial computer.
ERMETH	1955			Built by Eduard Stiefel, Heinz Rutishauser, Ambros Speiser at the ETH Zurich
HEC 4 (ICT 1200 series)	1955			Built by Andrew Booth
WEIZAC	1955	1		Built by the Weizmann Institute of Science (Israel) under the guidance of Prof. G. Estrin. First computer designed in the Middle East.
G2	1955			Built by the Max Planck Institute for Physics in Göttingen, esp. by Heinz Billing
Axel Wenner-Gren ALWAC III-E	1955			Commercially constructed and installed (in 1957) at the University of British Columbia and Oregon State University (then College)
IBM 305 RAMAC	1956	>1,000		The first commercial computer to use a moving-head hard-disk drive for secondary storage
PERM	1956	1		Built in Munich
D1	1956			Built by Joachim Lehmann at the TU Dresden
SMIL	1956	1		Built in Sweden and based on the IAS computer
Bendix G-15	1956	>400		A small computer for scientific and industrial purposes by the Bendix Corporation. It had a total of about 450 tubes (mostly dual triodes) and 300 germanium diodes.
TIFR Pilot Machine	1956			TIFRAC (Tata Institute of Fundamental Research Automatic Calculator) was the first computer developed in India, at the Tata Institute of Fundamental Research in Mumbai.
LGP-30	1956	~500		Data-processing system made by Librascope; bit-serial drum machine with only 113 tubes, along with 1450 diodes
UNIVAC 1103A	1956			First computer to have hardware interrupts
FUJIC	1956	1		The first electronic computer in Japan, designed to perform calculations for lens design by Fuji
Ferranti Pegasus	1956	38		Vacuum tube computer with magnetostrictive delay line memory intended for office usage. Second-oldest surviving computer in the world.
SILLIAC	1956	1		Built at the University of Sydney, based on the ILLIAC and ORDVAC
RCA BIZMAC	1956	6		RCA's first commercial computer, it contained 25,000 tubes.
Ural series	1956–1964			Ural-1 to Ural-4.
Elliott 405	1956	32		Elliott's first commercial/business machine. Marketed as National-Elliott 405.
BESM-2	1957	>20		Built in the Soviet Union. General-purpose computer in the BESM series.
CAB 3000	1957	4		Successor to the CAB 2000 series from the French SEA company. Had a parallel ALU for faster speed.
CIFA-1	1957	4		First computer built in Romania at the Institutul de Fizică Atomică (Atomic Physics Institute).
DASK	1957	1		The first computer in Denmark; had an early implementation of ALGOL
UNIVAC 1104	1957			A 30-bit variation of the UNIVAC 1103.
Ferranti Mercury	1957	19		An early commercial vacuum tube computer by Ferranti, with core memory and hardware floating point capability
IBM 610	1957	180		A small computer designed to be used by one person with limited experience
FACIT EDB 2	1957	9		
LEO II	1957	11		Commercial version of LEO I prototype.
MANIAC II	1957	1		Built by the University of California and the Los Alamos Scientific Laboratory.
MISTIC	1957	1		A Michigan State University based on the ILLIAC I.
MUSASINO-1	1957	1		A Japanese computer based on the ILLIAC I.
MMIF	1957			MMIF or Machine mathématique IRSIA-FNRS, devised by a team funded by the Belgian public institutions IRSIA and FNRS, and build at the Bell Telephone Mfg Co in Antwerp, from 1952. In use 1957–1958 in Antwerp, 1958–1959 in Brussels.
Sandia RAYPAC (Ray Path Analog Computer)	1957			Sandia's Blast Prediction Unit used for Operation Teapot.
EDSAC 2	1958	1		First computer to have a microprogrammed control unit. It had a bit-slice hardware implementation.
IBM 709	1958			An improved version of the IBM 704
UNIVAC II	1958			An improved, fully compatible version of the UNIVAC I
UNIVAC 1105	1958	3		A follow-up to the UNIVAC 1103 scientific computer
AN/FSQ-7	1958			Largest vacuum tube computer ever built. 52 were built for Project SAGE.
ZEBRA	1958	55		Designed in Holland and built by Britain's Standard Telephones and Cables
Ferranti Perseus	1959	2		
Rice Institute Computer	1959	1		Operational 1959-1971, 54-bit tagged architecture
Burroughs 220	1959	~50		Scientific/commercial computer, successor to ElectroData Datatron
Cyclone	1959	1		IAS-type computer at Iowa State College
DERA	1959	1		Built by Alwin Walther at the Technical University of Darmstadt; first operative in 1957, development completed in 1959
D2	1959			Built by Joachim Lehmann at the TU Dresden.
TIFRAC	1960			The first computer that was developed in India.
CER-10	1960			The first computer developed in Yugoslavia; it also used some transistors.
Philips PASCAL / STEVIN	1960			Philips Automatic Sequence Calculator; 1,200 valves, 10,000 transistors, and 15,000 germanium diodes. PASCAL and STEVIN (Dutch: Snel Tel En Vermenigvuldig INstrument, lit. 'Fast Count and Multiply Instrument') are identical, except input-output equipment. Both were used internally.
The Wegematic 1000	1960			Improved version of the ALWAC III-E
ZRA 1	1960			Built by VEB Carl Zeiss, Jena, German Democratic Republic
Minsk-1	1960			Built in Minsk, Soviet Union
Odra 1001	1960			First computer built by Elwro, Wroclaw, Poland
CEP	1961	1		The first computer developed in Italy by the Università di Pisa with Olivetti, it also used some transistors
G3	1961			Built by the Max Planck Institute for Physics in Göttingen, esp. by Heinz Billing
Sumlock ANITA calculator	1961	<10,000/year		Desktop calculator
UMC-1	1962			Developed in Poland, it used the unusual negabinary number system internally
BRLESC	1962	1		1,727 tubes and 853 transistors
OSAGE	1963	1		Close copy of the Rice Institute Computer built at the University of Oklahoma

== See also ==
- List of relay computers – Electromechanical computers
- List of transistorized computers – Digital computers that used discrete transistors as their primary logic elements
- History of computing hardware
