= IBM and the Seven Dwarfs =

In the history of computing, The Seven Dwarfs refers to a group of seven companies that competed with IBM during the 1960s and early 1970s. While IBM held a dominant market share (often referred to as "Snow White"), these seven competitors struggled to maintain a viable presence in the mainframe market against IBM.

The "Seven Dwarfs" era represented the height of the mainframe competition before the industry shifted toward minicomputers and personal computing.

== Origins ==
Company	Entered industry	Computing division	Products before digital computers	First significant computer
UNIVAC (Remington Rand)	1950	1950: Eckert–Mauchly Division & 1952: ERA Division	Typewriters and programmed punched card calculators (prototyped 1950)	UNIVAC I (via EMCC's BINAC); UNIVAC 1103 (via ERA's 1101)
NCR	1952	1953: Electronics Division	Cash registers and code-breaking machines	102-D (via CRC's 102-A)
Burroughs	1953	1949: Electronic Instrument Division	Adding machines and Electronic-Pulse Control Units (rack mountable Series 1000)	UDEC I; E101; 205 (via CEC's Datatron 30-203)
RCA	1953	1958: Electronic Data Processing Division	Vacuum tubes and Project Typhoon (Simulator)	BIZMAC
Honeywell	1955	1957: Electronic Data Processing Division	Automatic controls	DATAmatic 1000 (with Raytheon 1955–1957 via RAYDAC)
General Electric	1956	1954: Computer Department	Analog computers	OARAC; ERMA GE-100 (via SRI's ERMA I)
Control Data (CDC)	1957	N/A	N/A – Founded as a computer firm	CDC 1604

=== Seed companies acquired by Dwarves ===
Computer Project promoted by the Director of Engineering at CEC, Clifford Berry (ABC Co-Inventor)
Year	Model name	Status/role	Historical context
1951	CEC 30-201	Engineering Prototype	An early development model built by the computer division of Consolidated Engineering Corporation.
1952	CEC 30-202	Internal Refinement	An incremental model used for internal testing and further engineering development of the magnetic drum logic.
1953	CEC 30-203	First Commercial Model	The refined design that became a marketable product.
1954	Datatron 203	Rebranded Production Model	After CEC's computer division was spun off as ElectroData Corporation, the machine was branded as the Datatron.
1955	Datatron 204	Commercial EDP Model	Addition of magnetic tape capability (Datafile Units) and improved card auxiliary storage.
1956	Burroughs 205	Acquired Final Model	Burroughs Corporation absorbed ElectroData in 1956. The system was updated with floating-point hardware and rebranded as the Burroughs 205 (or Datatron 205).

Computer Project by the technical founders of the CRC company, who left Northrop Aircraft as a group
Year	Model	Description & significance
1950	CRC 101	Digital Differential Analyzer (DDA): A specialized computer for differential equations (like Northrop's MADDIDA). ~400 vacuum tubes.
1951	CRC 102	General-Purpose computer: An experimental system using ~200 vacuum tubes. Served as the engineering prototype for the 102A.
1953	CRC 102A (NCR CRC 102-A)	Scientific Computer: Acquired by NCR in 1953. A general-purpose machine using ~800 vacuum tubes and a magnetic drum (1,024 words).
1954	NCR 102-D	A version of the 102-A using Binary Coded Decimal (BCD) to process alphanumeric data and accounting tasks more efficiently.
1954	CRC 105	A variation of the DDA architecture designed for industrial engineering (utilizing decimal logic instead of binary). Decimal Digital Differential Analyzer (Lockheed's Mathematical Analysis Department) aerospace engineering simulations, solving equations related to aircraft stability and flight control.
1955	CRC 106	Optimized Fast-Converter of Input-Data: Used ~600 vacuum tubes for interpolation and data reduction (between instrument data-input and larger computers). WHITESAC (White Sands Automatic Computer) converted raw tracking and telemetry data into missile flight paths.
1955	CRC 107 (NCR 107)	Featured "Three Address Location" instructions : An advanced machine using ~1,200 vacuum tubes, it focused on high-speed sorting and data reduction. Navy Logistics Computer (Inventory Control & Record Keeping) "Three-Address" instructions meant faster file processing and it managed 8 to 10 tape units simultaneously.
1955	NCR 303	Electronic Data Processor: A high-capacity system using ~1,100 vacuum tubes. Specialized for tape file handling and business EDP.
1959	NCR 304	Transistorized successor to the 303.

=== Industry consolidation and fates ===
The group was eventually reduced to the "BUNCH" after General Electric and RCA exited the industry. The following table details the fate of each "Dwarf" and their eventual resulting entities.

Dwarf	Fate	Resulting entity
Burroughs	Merged with Sperry in 1986	Unisys
RCA	Sold computer division to Sperry in 1971	Exit from market
UNIVAC (Sperry)	Merged with Burroughs in 1986	Unisys
NCR	Acquired by AT&T in 1991; later spun off	NCR Voyix / NCR Atleos
Control Data (CDC)	Split and sold in 1992	Ceridian / BT Group
Honeywell	Sold computer division to Groupe Bull	Honeywell / Atos
General Electric (GE)	Sold computer division to Honeywell in 1970	Exit from market

== The Japanese connection: partners and competitors ==
During the 1960s and 70s, the Japanese Ministry of International Trade and Industry (MITI) encouraged domestic manufacturers to form strategic alliances with the American "Dwarfs" to acquire the technology necessary to compete with IBM.

=== Strategic alliances with the "Dwarfs" ===
While IBM maintained a wholly-owned subsidiary in Japan (IBM Japan), the American Dwarfs entered the market through technology transfers and joint ventures with Japanese firms:

- Hitachi and RCA: In 1961, Hitachi entered a technological agreement with RCA. The resulting HITAC 8000 series was largely based on the RCA Spectra 70 architecture, which was designed to be compatible with the IBM System/360.
- NEC and Honeywell: NEC partnered with Honeywell in 1962. The NEAC series 2200 was developed using Honeywell technology. When Honeywell later acquired GE's computer division, NEC gained access to the GCOS operating system, which became the foundation for their later ACOS systems.
- Toshiba and General Electric: Toshiba utilized GE technology for its large-scale systems. Following GE's exit from the market in 1970, Toshiba eventually pivoted its mainframe strategy toward the ACOS alliance with NEC.
- Mitsubishi Electric and Oki Electric with UNIVAC: These firms formed a joint venture with Sperry Rand (UNIVAC) known as Oki Univac, allowing them to manufacture and sell UNIVAC-based systems in Japan.

=== The "non-aligned" exception: Fujitsu ===
Unlike its domestic rivals, Fujitsu famously declined a direct partnership with an American "Dwarf" during the initial 1960s boom. Instead, Fujitsu focused on domestic R&D via the FONTAC project. However, they later adopted a "compatible" strategy by investing in Amdahl Corporation (founded by former IBMer Gene Amdahl), which allowed Fujitsu to produce the world's first IBM-compatible mainframes.

== RCA's European partners ==
The formation of the European Computer Manufacturers Association (ECMA) in 1961 was initiated by the chief executives of ICT, IBM (European division), and Bull. The key players involved in those initial organizational meetings were:

1. IBM — United States (the European division)
2. Bull (Compagnie des Machines Bull) — France
3. ICT (International Computers and Tabulators) — United Kingdom
4. Ferranti — United Kingdom
5. English Electric — United Kingdom
6. AEI (Associated Electrical Industries) — United Kingdom
7. Leo Computers — United Kingdom
8. Elliott Brothers — United Kingdom
9. Standard Telephones and Cables (STC) — United Kingdom
10. Siemens — West Germany
11. Zuse — West Germany
12. Telefunken — West Germany
13. Olivetti — Italy
- Siemens (in 1964) acquired a license from RCA to build computers based on the RCA Spectra 70 and marketed as the Siemens System 4004.
- English Electric (in 1965) acquired a license from RCA to build computers based on the RCA Spectra 70 and marketed as the English Electric System 4.

In the late 1960s, the British government—acting through the Ministry of Technology (MinTech)—sought to consolidate the UK computer industry to create a viable competitor to IBM. This led to the formation of International Computers Limited (ICL) in 1968.

ICL's failure:

- The UK Ministry's merger of English Electric into ICL created a "clash of architectures." ICL was forced to support both the domestic ICT 1900 series and the English Electric RCA system. This fragmented their resources and weakened the effort against IBM.
- CII-Siemens-Philips formed the Unidata alliance (in 1972) to build the "Unidata 7.000 Series" computer which was compatible with IBM.
- ICL declined joining the Unidata alliance promoting IBM compatibility, opting for a complete break with IBM compatibility in favor of the nationalistic interest in promoting their own computer as the "National Champion" against IBM.
- The lack of support by the United Kingdom and the nationalistic interests of France prevented a European unified computer architecture from challenging IBM's dominance.

== Transition to the BUNCH era ==
The transition from the Seven Dwarfs to the BUNCH occurred primarily because GE and RCA found the massive R&D costs required to compete with IBM's System/360 architecture unsustainable.

Following the 1971 exit of RCA—divesting its customer base and technology to Sperry Rand (UNIVAC). Effectively ending any future RCA-British collaborations like the English Electric System 4 derived from the RCA Spectra 70. The ICL pivoted from "mimicry" to "innovation" with the ICL 2900 Series.

The exit of GE (1970) and RCA (1971) caused a "shock" in the Japanese market, as their partners (Toshiba and Hitachi) were suddenly left without their primary technology sources. This led to the MITI-led reorganization of the Japanese industry into three groups to compete with IBM's System/370:

Group	Companies	Resulting series	Architecture influence
M Group	Fujitsu / Hitachi	M Series	IBM S/370 Compatible
A Group	NEC / Toshiba	ACOS Series	Honeywell / GE / GCOS
C Group	Mitsubishi / Oki	COSMO Series	UNIVAC / Independent

== Legacy ==
By the 1980s, the Japanese manufacturers had evolved from "junior partners" of the Dwarfs to become the primary global challengers to IBM, eventually acquiring several of their former mentors. Notably, Fujitsu eventually acquired Amdahl and ICL, while NEC maintained a long-term partnership with Bull (the successor to Honeywell's computer interests).

== See also ==
- History of computing hardware (1960s–present) – Context on the "Third Generation" of computing.
- Plug compatible manufacturer – The business model used by several competitors to coexist with IBM's software ecosystem.

== Bibliography ==
- Campbell-Kelly, Martin (1989). ICL: A Business and Technical History. Oxford University Press.
- Ceruzzi, Paul E. (2003). A History of Modern Computing. MIT Press.
- Cortada, James W. (1993). Before the Computer: IBM, NCR, Burroughs, and Remington Rand and the Industry They Created, 1865-1956. Princeton, New Jersey: Princeton University Press. ISBN 9781400872763.
- Fransman, Martin (1995). Japan's Computer and Communications Industry. Oxford University Press.
- Gray, George T.; Smith, Ronald Q. (2003). "Before the B5000: Burroughs Computers, 1951-1963". IEEE Ann. Hist. Comput. 25 (2): 50–61. Bibcode:2003IAHC...25b..50G. doi:10.1109/MAHC.2003.1203058.
- Green, Tom (2010). Bright Boys: The Making of Information Technology. CRC Press. ISBN 978-1-4398-6522-4.
- McGee, Russell C. (2004). My Adventures with Dwarfs: A Personal History in Mainframe Computers. Online Edition.
- Oldfield, Homer R. (1996). King of the Seven Dwarfs: General Electric's Ambiguous Challenge to the Computer Industry. IEEE Computer Society Press.
