= ElectroData Corporation =

Defunct computer company

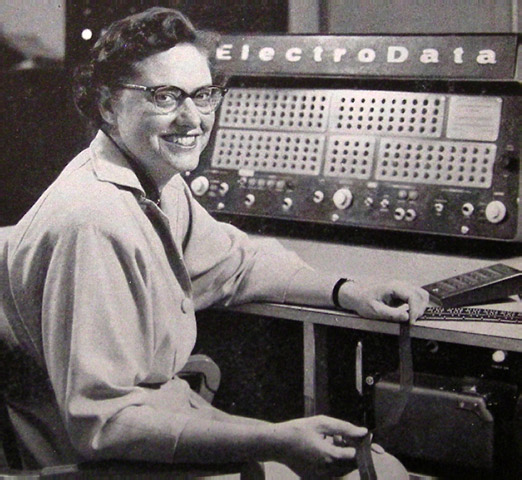
Sibyl Rock with an ElectroData Datatron computer in 1955

The ElectroData Corporation was a computer company located in Pasadena, California.

ElectroData originated as a part of Consolidated Electrodynamics Corporation (CEC), which manufactured scientific equipment. Clifford Berry and Sibyl M. Rock developed an analog computer to process the output of CEC's mass spectrometer. Berry then urged CEC to develop a digital computer as a follow-on. In 1951 CEC enlisted Harry Huskey, who managed the development of the SWAC computer on the project.

In May 1952, CEC pre-announced the "CEC 30-201" computer, a vacuum tube computer with a magnetic-drum memory. That same year CEC reorganized computer development into a separate Computer Division. In 1954 the division was spun off into a separate public company named ElectroData. In 1954 the first model of the computer, now named the Datatron 203 shipped to the Jet Propulsion Laboratory in Pasadena. The purchase price was $125,000. The company shipped seven more 203 systems in 1954 and thirteen in 1955.

By 1956 ElectroData was the third-largest computer manufacturer in the world, but was unable to generate enough revenue to meet the demands of growing the business. That year Burroughs Corporation, at that time a manufacturer of electro-mechanical office equipment, made a deal to acquire ElectroData in a stock swap, and renamed it the ElectroData Division of Burroughs Corporation. The Datatron was renamed the Burroughs 205.
