= Sibyl M. Rock =

American inventor (1909–1981)

Sibyl Martha Rock
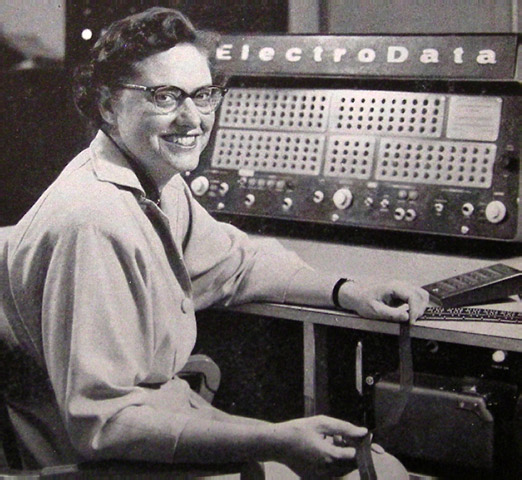
- Operating an ElectroData computer, 1955
- Born: August 1, 1909; Butte, Montana, United States
- Died: November 17, 1981 (aged 72); Los Angeles, California, United States
- Education: University of California, Los Angeles (B.S., Mathematics, 1931)
- Scientific career
- Fields: Mass spectrometry
- Workplaces: Consolidated Engineering Corporation

Sibyl Martha Rock (August 1, 1909 – November 17, 1981) was an American inventor who was a pioneer in mass spectrometry and computing. Rock was a key person in Consolidated Engineering Corporation's (CEC) mass spectrometry team at a time when mass spectrometers were first being commercialized for use by researchers and scientists. Rock was instrumental in developing mathematical techniques for analyzing the results from mass spectrometers, in developing an analog computer with Clifford Berry for analysis of equations, and in sustaining an ongoing dialog between engineers and customers involved in development of both the mass spectrometer and an early digital computer, CEC's Datatron.

== Early life and education ==
Sibyl M. Rock was born on August 1, 1909, in Butte, Montana. Her father was a telephone technician, which may have interested her in technology. She entered the University of California, Los Angeles in 1927, earning a degree in mathematics in 1931. While at UCLA, she was president of the local chapter of Pi Mu Epsilon, the national mathematics society. She also received a Phi Beta Kappa key.

== Career ==
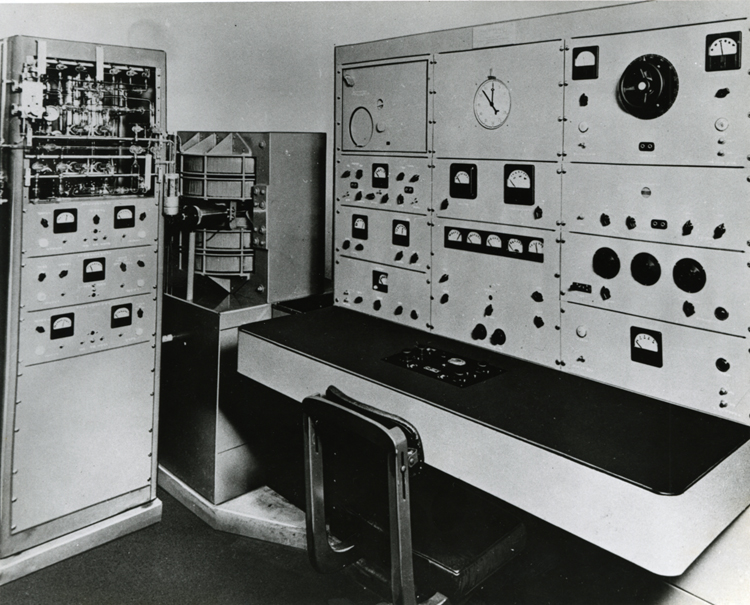
CEC Model 21-101 mass spectrometer, built by Consolidated Engineering Corporation.

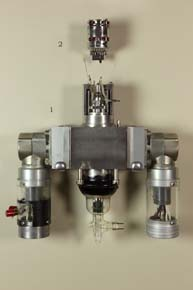
Isatronic source housing of CEC 103 Mass Spectrometer

Rock was employed as a "geophysical computer" in the petroleum industry, first at Rieber Laboratories, and then in 1938 at Herbert Hoover, Jr.'s newly formed United Geophysical Corporation. She transferred into United's engineering and instrument subsidiary, Consolidated Engineering Corporation, when they began to develop the mass spectrometer as a commercial product. The first 21-101 Mass Spectrometer was delivered in December 1942. Sibyl Rock worked in the CEC research group with employees such as Harold Wiley, manager for Chemical Instruments, Harold Washburn, and Clifford Berry. In 1947, she joined the sales department. In sales, she worked closely with people at chemical and refining companies who were potential customers for the mass spectrometer and early digital computers, identifying their needs and concerns. People such as Seymour Meyerson, who worked for Standard Oil of Indiana, were active contributors to Rock's CEC Users' Group. Rock transferred again in 1952, to the organization's newly formed computer division. As of 1953, she was "in charge of sales and application functions of the Computer Division" with the title "Acting Manager, Application Service" and was the first female sales engineer of ElectroData Corporation.

=== Mixture analysis, manuals and standards ===
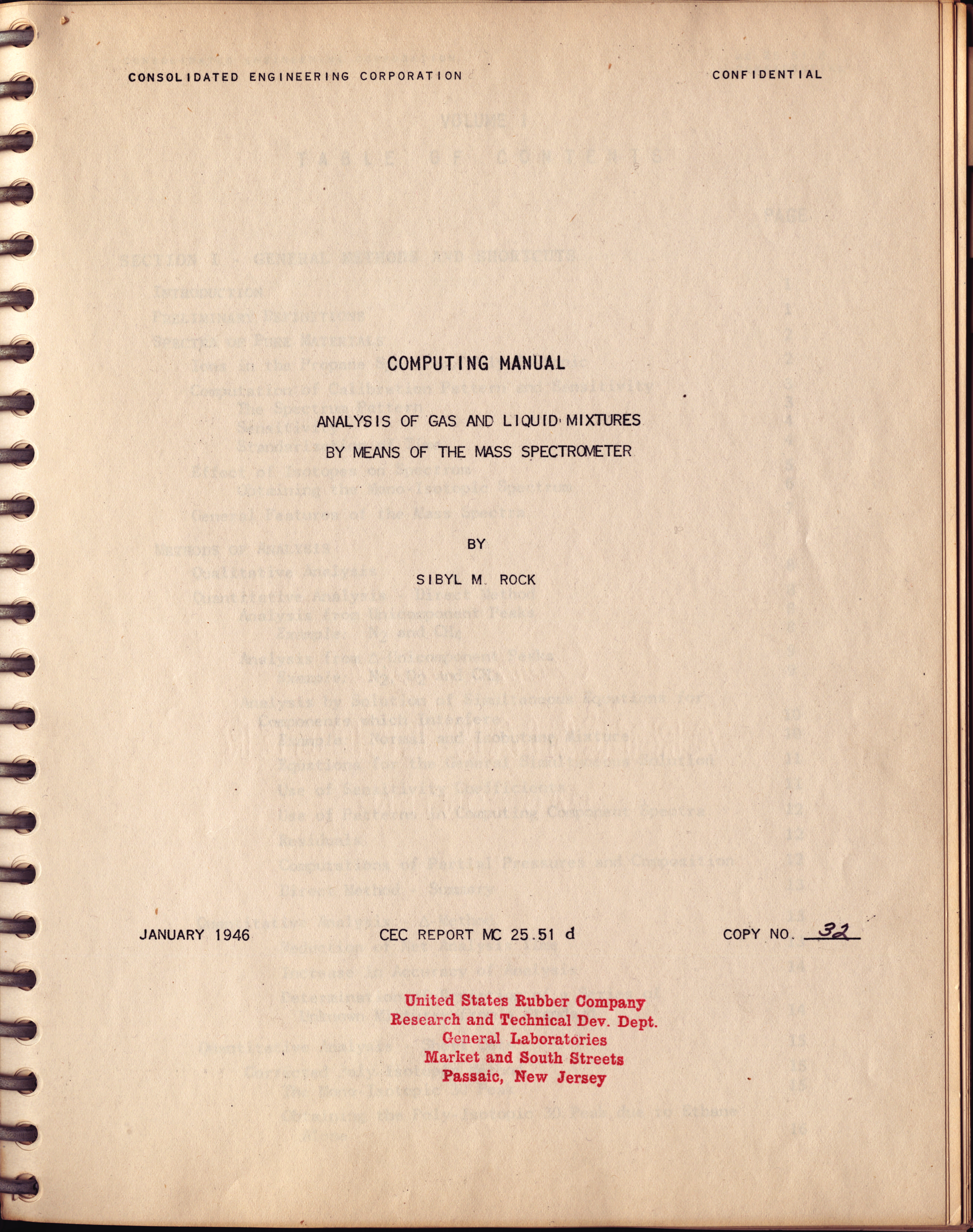
The title page of Rock's 1946 CEC Computing Manual

By the mid-1940s Rock had made several outstanding contributions to the field. She devised many of the procedures of mixture analysis, and wrote the computing manuals used by CEC's customers, such as the Computing Manual: Analysis of Gas and Liquid Mixtures by Means of the Mass Spectrometer (1946). Her work contributed to the creation of standards for instruments and methods in a rapidly developing field.

She also did basic analysis, with Martin Shepherd of the National Bureau of Standards, of the first Pasadena smog samples. This research produced valuable information about the presence and types of hydrocarbons in Los Angeles air, and about the oxidization of hydrocarbons with ozone and nitrogen oxides.

=== Solving simultaneous equations ===
Rock was also instrumental in developing mathematical techniques for analyzing the results from mass spectrometers. In 1946, with Clifford Berry, she developed an analog computer capable of solving multiple simultaneous linear equations, suitable for the analysis of data from mass spectrometers. They patented an analog computer that could efficiently solve a series of 12 simultaneous equations in 12 unknowns.

=== User experience and ongoing development ===
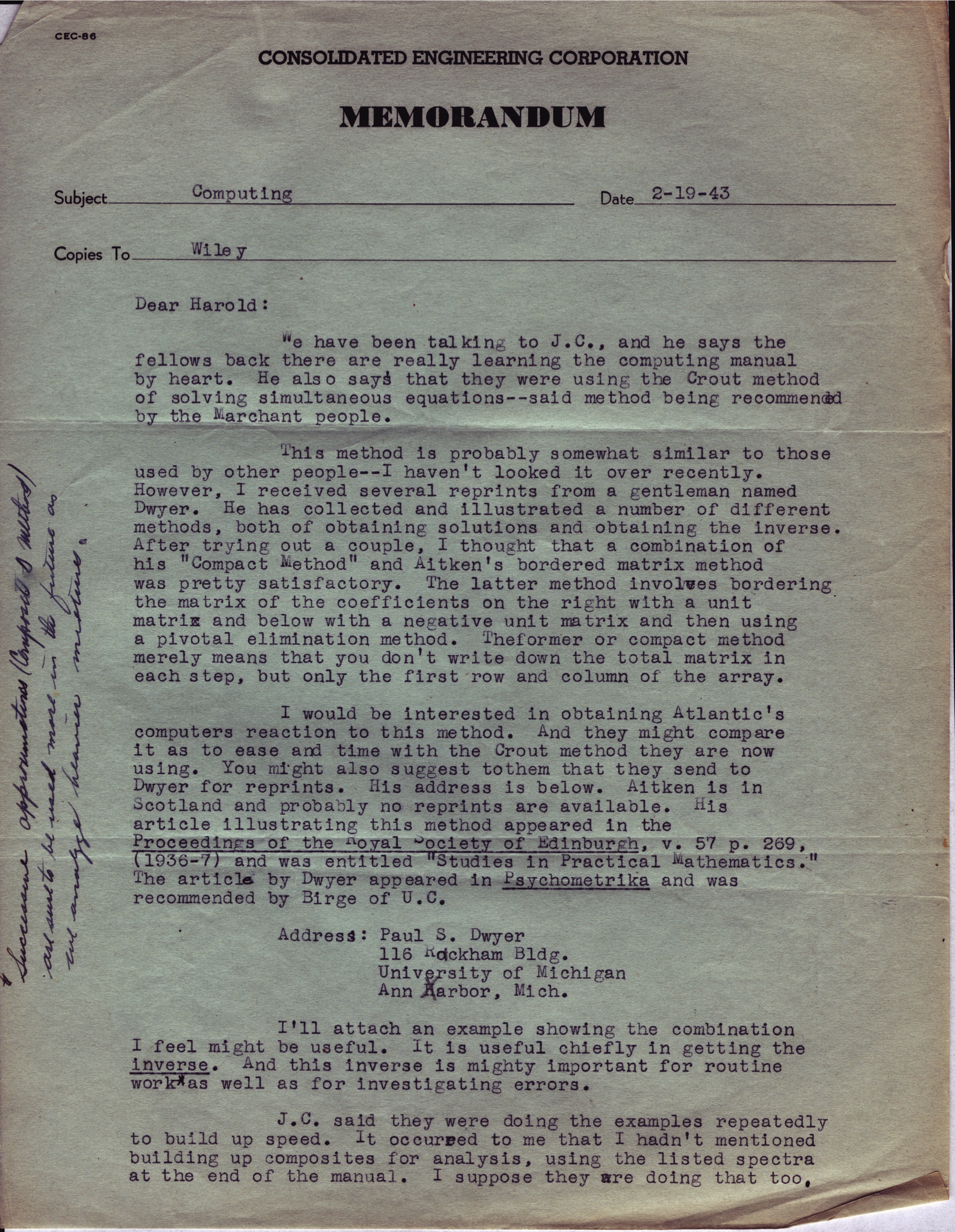
A letter from Sibyl Rock to Harold Wiley regarding computing, 1943

Mass-spectrometer users were developing instruments for their own purposes on a lab-by-lab basis, modifying and experimenting with them at a rapid rate. Feedback from the field and effective communication about needs and problems were critical to CEC's success in building and marketing mass spectrometers. Sibyl Rock was engaged in developing the instruments and the procedures for their use. She was also a key person assisting Consolidated's customers in the use of those instruments and techniques, including the use of Cliff Berry's analog computer.

Rock understood the technical aspects of how the instrument worked and the mathematical aspects of the calculations it was supposed to compute. Because she worked closely with CEC's customer base, she also understood the instrumentation needs of CEC's growing list of customers. Rock collaborated with Harold Wiley, manager of chemical instruments, to review both old and new instruments, assessing their operational status and identifying needed improvements. Rock continuously drew upon her knowledge of the latest methods used by customers and their critiques and problem reports about the instrumentation, to improve CEC's products.

=== The Datatron ===
Clifford Berry encouraged CEC to develop a digital computer. Harry Huskey and Ernst Selmer were involved as lecturers and consultants in the development process. Sibyl Rock worked closely with Ernst Selmer on coding problems for the machine before it even existed in hardware. She also encouraged potential customers to try coding problems for the Datatron, ensuring that the system would perform in ways that would be useful to them. She helped customers with coding and ensured that their problems would run on the "breadboard" and "prototype" systems.

Sibyl Rock once described her work as follows:

'For the past several years I have written Product Specifications for digital computers and related peripheral gear. The engineering design is done by engineers. The Product Specification forms a "contract" between engineering and marketing to assure that both interested parties know what is to be built. Because the engineer may be too optimistic as to what he can produce and what reliability he can achieve, and because marketing wants the moon for zero dollars, the product specification writer is needed as a negotiator.'

Formal announcement of the new ElectroData 203 computer took place in February 1954. By 1956, ElectroData became the third largest manufacturer of computers in the world, but lacked the funds necessary to expand successfully. On July 1, 1956 Burroughs Corporation purchased ElectroData Corporation from CEC. The basic architecture remained the same even though the computer was marketed under various names: the CEC 30-201, CEC 30-203, the ElectroData 204 and 205, and the Burroughs 205.

In 1961, the Datatron 205 was used during the first launch of a Saturn rocket at Cape Canaveral, to analyze real-time guidance data.

== Personal life and death ==
Rock actively encouraged women and girls to become mathematicians and to take up careers in engineering.

She died November 17, 1981, in Los Angeles, California.

== Scholarly publications ==
In addition to the manuals she wrote, Rock was active in scholarly publishing and coauthored significant papers with several of her colleagues, including:

- Washburn, H. W.; Wiley, H. F.; Rock, S. M. (September 1943). "The mass spectrometer as an analytical tool". Ind. Eng. Chem. 15 (9): 541–547. doi:10.1021/i560121a001.
- Berry, Clifford E.; Wilcox, Doyle E.; Rock, S. M.; Washburn, H. W. (1946). "A Computer for Solving Linear Simultaneous Equations". J. Appl. Phys. 17 (4): 262. Bibcode:1946JAP....17..262B. doi:10.1063/1.1707713.
- Rock, S. M. (February 1951). "Qualitative analysis from mass spectra". Anal. Chem. 23 (2): 261–268. doi:10.1021/ac60050a011.
- Berry, Clifford E.; Rock, S. M. (1951). "High Resolution Mass Spectrometry". J. Chem. Phys. 19 (9): 1208. Bibcode:1951JChPh..19.1208B. doi:10.1063/1.1748508.
- Shepherd, Martin; Rock, S. M.; Howard, Royce; Stormes, John (1951-10-01). "Isolation, identification, and estimation of gaseous pollutants in air". Anal. Chem. 23 (10): 1431–1440. doi:10.1021/ac60058a020.
