= Ernst Sejersted Selmer =

Norwegian mathematician

- Born: 11 February 1920
- Died: 8 November 2006 (aged 86)
- Education: University of Oslo
- Known for: Advanced research within cryptography that formed the basis of modern crypto machines in NATO and NSA
- Awards: Order of St. Olav
- Scientific career
- Fields: Mathematics, Cryptography, Computer science
- Workplaces: University of Oslo Cambridge University Institute for Advanced Study University of Bergen

Ernst Sejersted Selmer (11 February 1920 – 8 November 2006) was a Norwegian mathematician, who worked in number theory, as well as a cryptologist. The Selmer group of an Abelian variety is named after him. His primary contributions to mathematics reside within the field of diophantine equations. He started working as a cryptologist during the Second World War; due to his work, Norway became a NATO superpower in the field of encryption.

== Biography ==
=== Early life ===
Ernest S. Selmer was born in Oslo in the family of Professor Ernst W. Selmer and Ella Selmer (born Sejersted). He was the brother of Knut S. Selmer, who married Elisabeth Schweigaard, as well as first cousin of Francis Sejersted.

Already early in school, Selmer demonstrated mathematical talent. When attending Stabekk high school he was an editor of the school's magazine Tall og tanker (numbers and thoughts). In 1938, he won Crown Prince Olav's Mathematics Prize for high school graduates. From 1942–1943, he studied at the University of Oslo. As a student at the university during World War II, Selmer was involved in encrypting secret messages for the Norwegian resistance movement. During the autumn of 1943 when the Germans forced the University to close he escaped to Sweden, just in time before the Nazi Germany secret police Gestapo closed the university and arrested the male students.

In 1944 Selmer was sent to London, where he took technical responsibility for all Norwegian military and civilian cipher machines. The communication was mainly carried out using the Hagelin cipher machine. When the war ended, Selmer returned to Norway, and in 1946, was hired as a lecturer in the University of Oslo. In the same year, he started working for the Cipher Department of the Armed Forces Security Service as a consultant. With colleagues, he built a communication system for Norway's equivalent of the MI5, which was used from 1949 till 1960. Selmer spent the spring of 1949 at the Cambridge University working with the famous mathematician JWS Cassels. One fruit of his collaboration with Cassels was a simple example of a cubic form which doesn't satisfy the Hasse principle. More than a decade after their initial collaboration, a group related to an Abelian variety—namely, the Selmer group—was discovered by Cassels and named after Selmer. In 1993, Andrew Wiles used the Selmer group in his proof of Fermat's last theorem.

=== Middle years ===
Selmer received his dr.philos in 1952 from the University of Oslo and was at the same time hired as a lecturer for the university. Among Selmer's lectures, his lectures on data processing is of particular note, as it helped lay the foundation for the Department of Informatics at the university. In the same year, he received a Rockefeller Foundation Fellowship to study in the United States during the years 1951–1952. Selmer arrived in January 1951 as a visiting scholar at the Institute for Advanced Study in Princeton, N.J. where the IAS machine was being constructed for John von Neumann. During his stay in Princeton he also met with people such as Albert Einstein, J. Robert Oppenheimer and his countryman Atle Selberg. Einstein is said to have been the first person Selmer met on arrival in Princeton on a Saturday afternoon, and apparently took on the task as campus guide with open arms.

From Princeton, Selmer traveled to Berkeley where he contributed to Paul Morton's construction of the CALDIC computer. He was hired by Consolidated Engineering Corporation (CEC) on von Neumann's recommendation in late 1951 and designed much of the logic for their Datatron computer, working closely with other CEC employees such as Sibyl M. Rock. Later the computer was named Burroughs 205 and it was the most serious competitor of IBM 650. He returned to the Institute for Advanced Study again as a visiting scholar in 1952. In late 1952, Selmer returned to Oslo, and started working on a military computer. A product of this work was implemented in a computer, which was installed in the Norwegian Defence Research Establishment in 1957.

On September 25, 1953 Selmer applied for a U.S. Patent for an Electronic Adder. This patent, No. 2,947,479, was awarded on August 2, 1960.

=== Later life ===
At the age of mere 37 Selmer took a position of a full professor in mathematics at the University of Bergen, which was a huge feat in 1957. At the university he was involved in designing two ciphers for NATO. In 1962, a hotline between the Kremlin and Washington was established via the Norwegian-developed encryption equipment ETCRRM II (Electronic Teleprinter Cryptographic Regenerative Repeater Mixer) from STK.

At the University of Bergen Selmer started studying Linear Shift Registers and lectured on the subject. He commissioned a theoretical basis for linear shift register sequences in the 1960s on behalf of the Cipher Department. His lecture notes were published several times, under the title "Linear Recurrence Relations over Finite Fields". In his lecture on EUROCRYPT'93, Ernst Sejersted Selmer gave an overview of what he had contributed to the field of cryptography.

From 1960–1966, Selmer served as vice dean at the Faculty of Mathematics and Natural Sciences at the University of Bergen, and dean from 1966–1968. Selmer was a member of the Council for Electronic Data Processing in the Norwegian state from its establishment in 1961 to 1973.

=== Personal relations ===
Selmer was married to Signe Randi Johanne Faanes and had one daughter, the microbiologist Johanne-Sophie Selmer who was educated at Karlstad University. His wife became his support throughout his life, and his great efforts in many fields would probably not have been possible without her. While work was his life, he was also a man that gave his home and family high priority. One time Selmer would not want to break a deal with his daughter in favor of a meeting with Fields Medal winner Alan Baker. Selmer was also fond of gardening as a hobby and the famous botanist Knut Fægri used to make excursions to Selmer's garden.

In 1990 he retired with his wife in Ski and was in good physical and mental shape until he was hit by a stroke in the fall of 2004; after the stroke he was never the same. On the 8th of November 2006 Selmer fell asleep quietly.

Selmer was elected member of the Norwegian Academy of Science and Letters in 1961, and became a knight of the 1st class of the Order of St. Olav in 1983.

In 2020, the University of Bergen published the book "Professor in Secret Service", which is a biography on Selmer.

== Legacy ==
In honor of Prof. Ernst Sejersted Selmer the University of Bergen established the Selmer Center in 2003. The Selmer Center held a leading position in the field of cryptography nationally and internationally, with roots going back 70 years.

Selmer is behind the algorithm used to calculate the check digits in Norwegian birth numbers.

Norwegian-developed mathematical theory became an important contribution to the modernization of crypto-algorithms in NATO and the NSA. Selmer's advanced research formed the basis for National Security Agency to develop modern crypto machines.

== Publications ==
- Selmer, Ernst S. (1966), Linear recurrence relations over finite fields, Department of Mathematics, University of Bergen
