= Karl Otto Lange =

Karl Otto Heinrich Lange, Dr.-Ing. (1903 – November 29, 1973) was a pioneer in aviation (soaring), atmospheric science, engineering education, and biomedical engineering (effects of gravity and vibration).

Lange joined the meteorology faculty of the Massachusetts Institute of Technology in 1931. After his arrival, according to THE TECH, MIT's newspaper, daily weather observations from the ground level to a height of more than three miles (5 km) above Boston will be made by meteorologists of the Massachusetts Institute of Technology in an airplane equipped to record temperature, barometric pressure and relative humidity.

To carry out this work, MIT secured funds to purchase a Cessna cabin monoplane powered with a 120 horsepower (89 kW) Warner engine. The daily flights of this plane were part of a research program designed to gain new knowledge to aid in weather forecasting by measuring the variation of temperature and moisture at various altitudes in different air currents.

== Improvement in weather data ==
C. G. A. Rossby, who led the institute's division of Meteorology, collaborated in studies to develop improved methods of recording weather data for comprehensive studies of cloud formations and their connection with the vertical structure of the atmosphere. Specially designed photographic equipment was installed in the plane. The readings are automatically and continuously recorded throughout the flight on a thin sheet of smoked aluminum foil on a revolving drum. The research plane has places for three passengers in addition to the pilot, and was fitted with various scientific instruments for special weather studies, including a meteorograph used for registering temperature, barometric pressure and relative humidity.

Lange and associates designed automatically recording instruments for measuring the intensity of cosmic rays. Previous experiments on cosmic rays have been made on mountain tops or with sounding balloons.

== Under K. O. Lange ==
The MIT meteorology survey program was directed by Lange, who for several years was engaged in similar activities for the Rhon-Rossiten Geschellschaft at Darmstadt, and also on the Wasserkuppe, the birthplace of the motorless airplane. During this time he took an active part in the development of the scientific basis for soaring and gliding flight. Professor Daniel C. Sayre, assistant professor of aeronautical engineering, was the research pilot of MIT's flying laboratory. The daily weather flights are made in the morning from the East Boston Airport. In several trial flights Professor Sayre has taken the plane to a height of 17,000 feet (5,200 m), despite unfavorable weather conditions.

== Gliding at Elmira ==
In 1932, Time magazine published an article the Third Annual National Soaring Meet in Elmira, New York where an enthusiastic little group of glider pilots had prayed that the winds of the Chemung Valley would persist. Most importantly, a meteorological service was provided at the meet by Massachusetts Institute of Technology which loaned Dr. Karl 0. Lange, an authority on soaring. Each day at 5 a. m. a plane climbed to 13,000 ft (4,000 m) with M. I. T.'s special instruments for recording weather data. At 7 a.m. Dr. Lange directed the glider pilots to the best ridge for the day's soaring, told them what currents to expect. Then pilots and crews started for the ridge, dragging their craft on trailers.

== Held as enemy alien ==
According to the New York Times on 19 January 1942, Lange, German-born instructor at Harvard University's Blue Hills meteorological observatory, had been in Federal custody since December 8, 1941 as an enemy alien, according to members of the Harvard faculty. Lange was formerly a physicist for the German government. Dr. Lange was an internationally recognized expert in long-range weather forecasting and the theory of gliding and soaring. He was 39 years old at that time and had been in the United States since 1931, formerly as a faculty member at MIT. The FBI refused to confirm Dr. Lange's arrest.

== Wenner-Gren Laboratory at University of Kentucky ==
Lange was appointed Director of the Wenner Gren Laboratory at the University of Kentucky in 1953. The laboratory was a unit of the Mechanical Engineering Department. Lange obtained authority to restore the name of Wenner-Gren to the laboratory while developing new areas of research and development.

Axel Lennart Wenner-Gren was a Swedish entrepreneur and one of the wealthiest men in the world during the 1930s. The basis of Wenner-Gren's fortune was his early appreciation that the industrial vacuum cleaner could be adapted for domestic use. Soon after the First World War he persuaded the Swedish lighting company Electrolux, for which he then worked (securing the contract to floodlight the opening ceremony of the Panama Canal, among other successes), to buy the patent to a cleaner and to pay him for sales in company stock. By the early 1930s, Wenner-Gren was the owner of Electrolux, and the firm was a leading brand in both vacuum cleaner and refrigerator technology. Wenner-Gren also diversified his interests into the ownership of newspapers, banks and arms manufacturers, and acquired many of the holdings of the disgraced safety-match tycoon Ivar Kreuger.

The Wenner-Gren Aeronautical Research Laboratory at the University of Kentucky was built in 1941 with a gift of the Viking Foundation. It was named for Axel Wenner-Gren, a Swedish industrialist who created the Foundation.

Lange and colleagues were involved the development of the Massie Sliding Hip Nail and the Lange Skinfold Caliper in the period 1954 to 1957. A program to investigate whole body response to vibrations was initiated in 1957 and the first graduate degree based on biomedical engineering research was awarded in 1959. A USAF contract awarded in 1959 to train chimpanzees for the Mercury Space Flight program marked the major shift of activity in the laboratory to predominantly biomedical engineering research. This period also saw the establishment of the U.K. College of Medicine and the research in the area of human response to vibrations was developed through collaborative efforts with the Department of Physiology and Biophysics. The research related to space flight continued under funding from the NASA and studies of gravity effects on biological systems are still a significant part of the center's research program. A U.K. biomedical engineering student was awarded first place honors in regional and national competition for the best technical paper presented by a graduate student to the Institute of Aerospace Sciences (now AIAA) in 1962.

The NASA research program prompted the 1966 expansion of the laboratory to house the 50 feet (15 m) diameter centrifuge for the investigation of gravity effects on earth organisms. From 1967 to 1982, research programs in cardiovascular and musculoskeletal dynamics were developed and the NASA research expanded to include a series of rocket flights (Aerobee 250A rockets) dedicated to experiments conducted by University of Kentucky investigators from the Wenner-Gren Laboratory.

== Epilogue ==
Lange received an honorary Doctor of Science at the University of Kentucky May 1972 Commencement.

The Dr. Karl Otto Lange Memorial Fellowship at the University of Kentucky College of Engineering supports a U.S. citizen and native of Kentucky, ranked in the top 25% of student's discipline's class, who wishes to pursue a Master of Science degree in the manufacturing systems engineering program.

Lange died at age 70, on November 29, 1973. He was a powerful force in the early days of soaring in Germany and in the U.S. from 1931 until the sport was shut down during WWII.

As a professor of meteorology at MIT and Harvard in those days, he was instrumental in explaining to soaring pilots the intricacies of air mass analysis, and, as Director of the National Soaring Contests in 1936 and 1937, he did much to bring proper standards of organization and operation to the annual meets at Harris Hill. Lange was a Director of the Soaring Society from 1933 to 1939.

Many pilots today use Lange-designed barographs featuring a fixed reference datum from which all aneroid pen deflections are measured. He was an inventor and designer with interests ranging from pest control by aircraft to training chimpanzees for the Space Program.

His survivors are his wife Elizabeth, two sons, and five grandchildren at the time of his death.
