= MIDAC =

Pioneering digital computer completed in 1953

MIDAC was the acronym for the Michigan Digital Automatic Computer, a pioneering digital computer at the University of Michigan, the university's first. Work commenced on it in 1951, under collaborative sponsorship of the Wright Air Development Center and the United States Air Force, and the Willow Run Research Center of the Engineering Research Institute at the University of Michigan. The intention was to produce a machine to assist with "the solution of certain complex military problems."

== History ==
MIDAC was patterned after SEAC (Standards Electronic Automatic Computer), built in 1950 for the U.S. National Bureau of Standards.

The sixth such digital automatic computer at a research university, and the first computer of its kind in the Midwest, MIDAC was a massive installation. It featured 500,000 connections and vacuum tubes, which required 12 tons of refrigeration to cool. Its main memory was a rotating magnetic drum, capable of storing 6,000 "words" of encoded data.

The MIDAC went online on June 1, 1953, and was operated by Willow Run's Digital Computation Department under the leadership of John Carr III until 1958, when it was supplanted by the faster Michigan Digital Special Automatic Computer (MDSAC) – an IBM 650 – and the Air Force removed the equipment.

=== ENIAC ===
Although it was not created there, a piece of the ENIAC (Electronic Numerical Integrator And Computer) exists at the University of Michigan. It was developed at the Moore School of Engineering at the University of Pennsylvania, and was brought to Michigan in the mid-1960s by professor Arthur Burks, who had served as a principal designer of ENIAC. Burks came to the University of Michigan in 1946 as a professor of philosophy, but went on to study at the Moore School before being drawn into the ENIAC project.

== See also ==
- ILLIAC
- List of vacuum-tube computers
