= SWAC (computer) =

Early electronic digital computer built in 1950

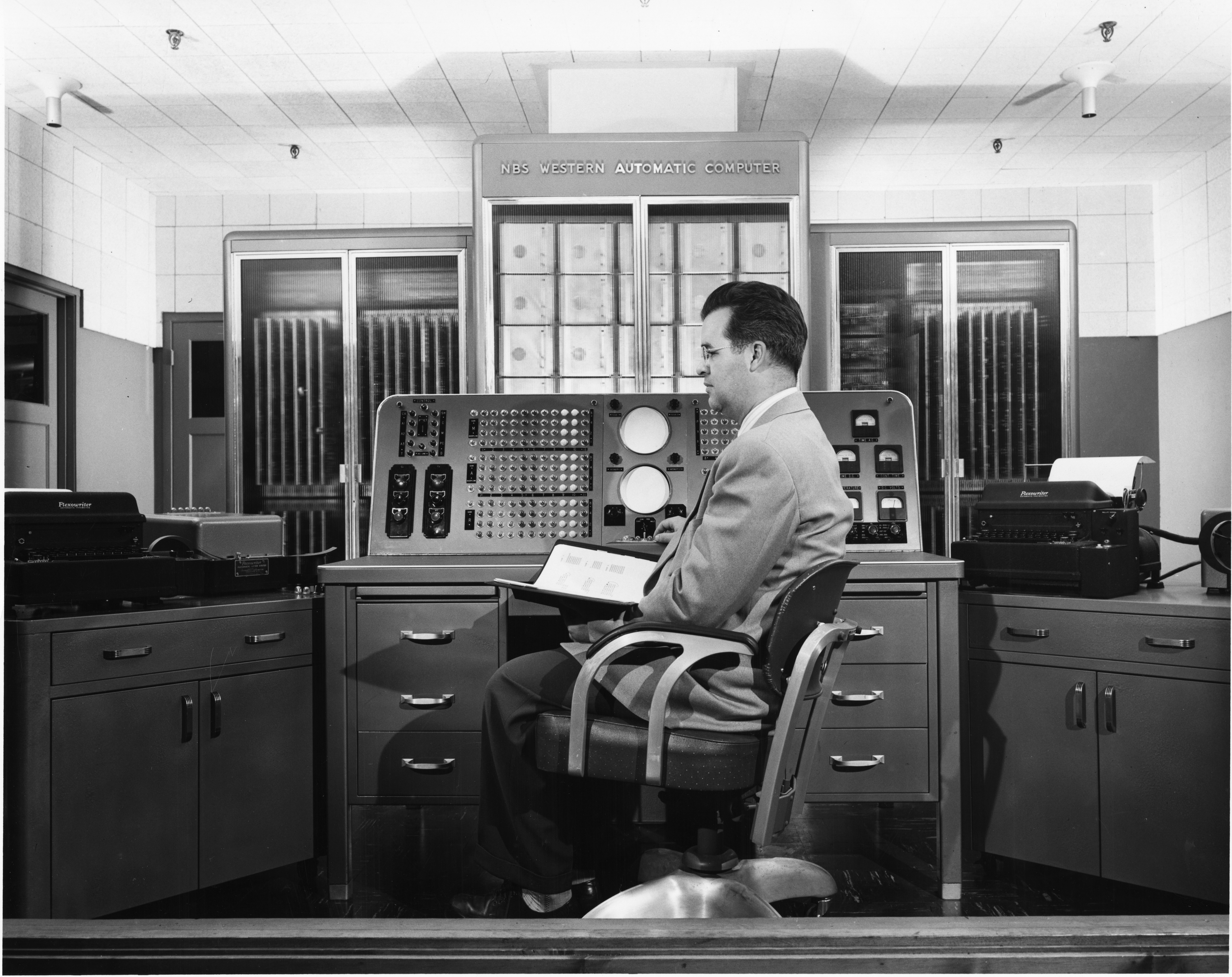
- SWAC. Williams tube memory is in center rear.
- Also known as: Standards Western Automatic Computer
- Manufacturer: U.S. National Bureau of Standards (NBS)
- Released: 1950; 76 years ago
- Units sold: 1
- Memory: 256 words, with each word being 37 bits (Williams tubes)

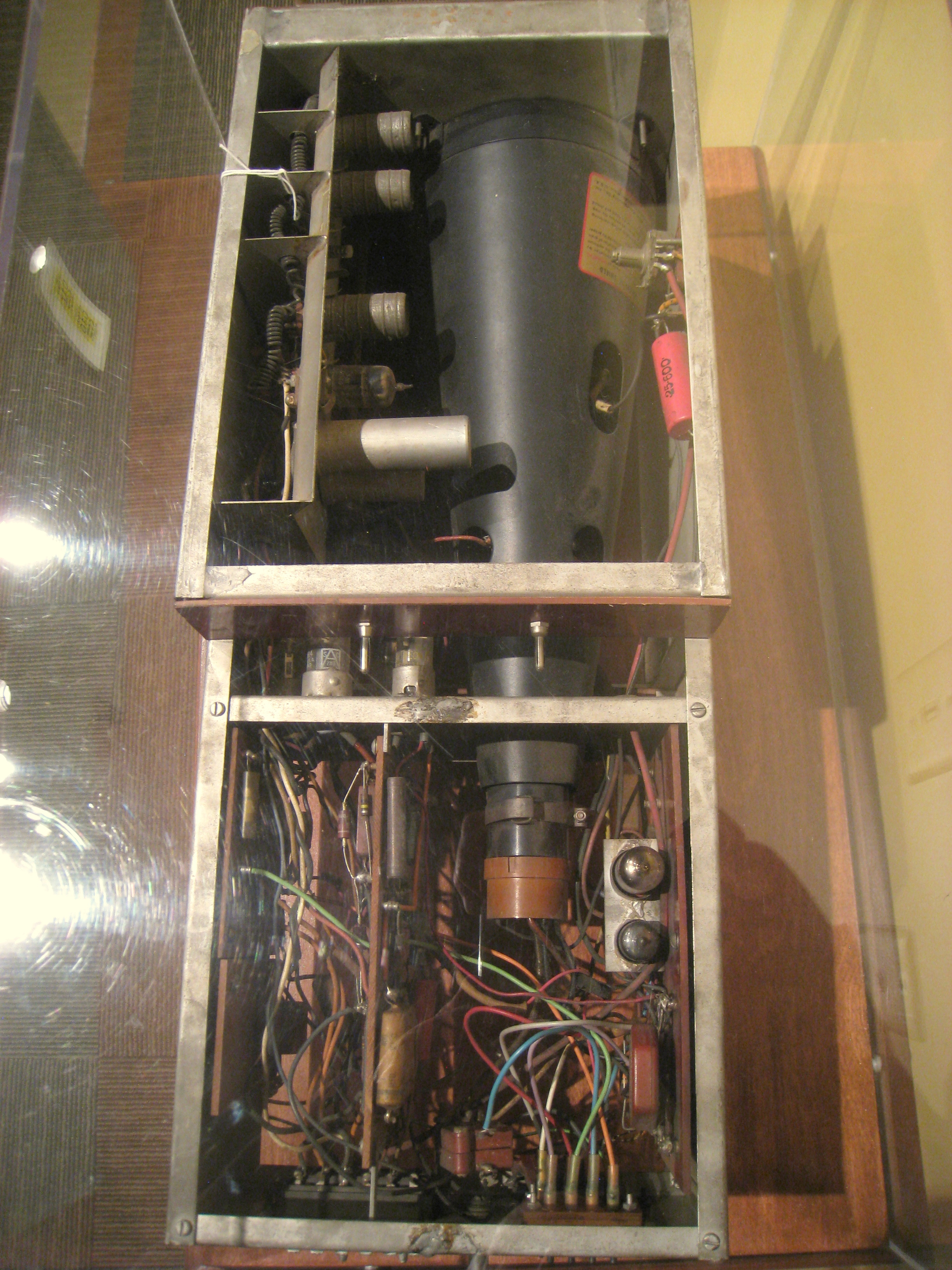
SWAC Williams tube memory unit

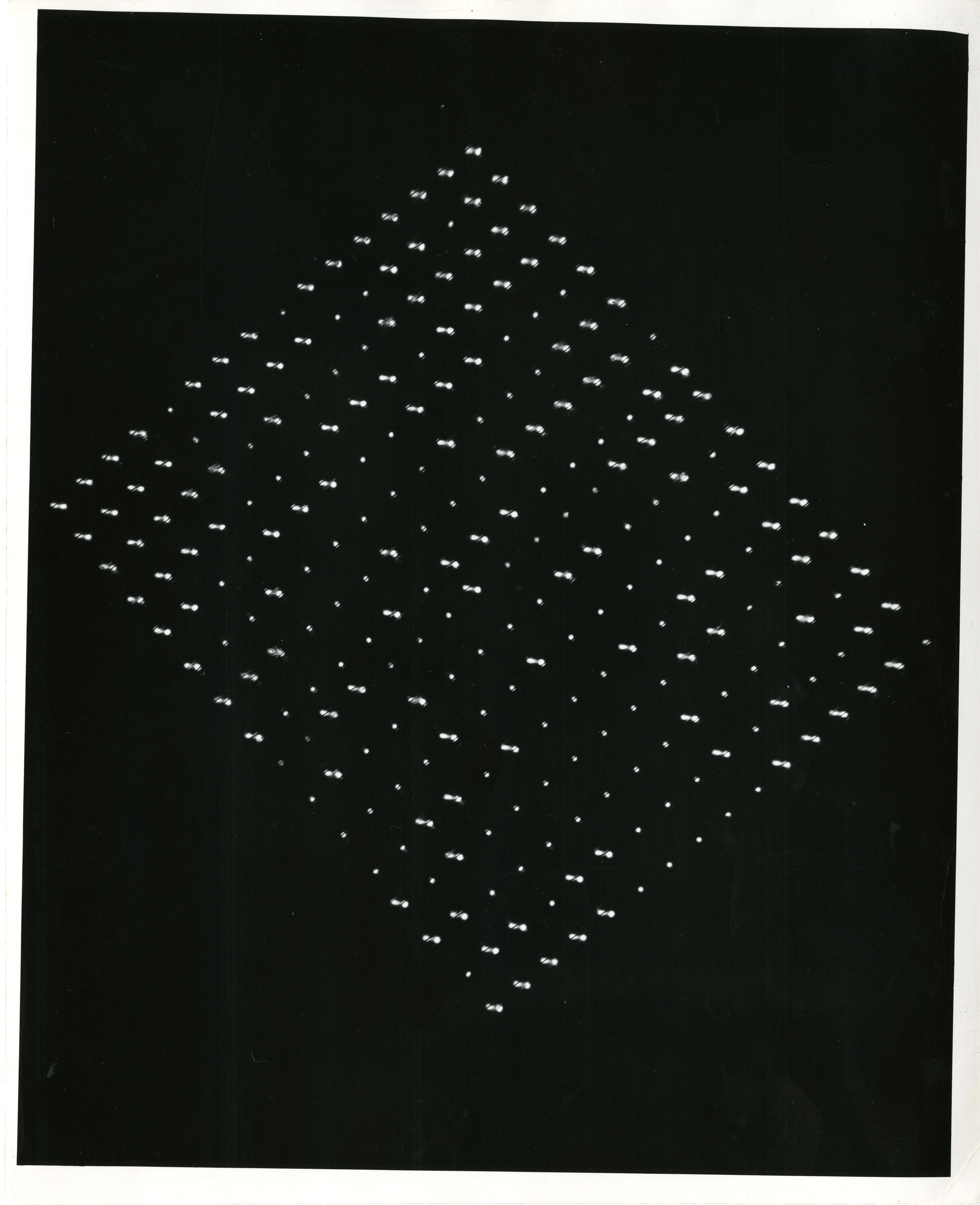
Memory pattern on SWAC Williams tube CRT

The SWAC (Standards Western Automatic Computer) was an early electronic digital computer built in 1950 by the U.S. National Bureau of Standards (NBS) in Los Angeles, California. It was designed by Harry Huskey.

== Overview ==
Like the SEAC which was built about the same time, the SWAC was a small-scale interim computer designed to be built quickly and put into operation while the NBS waited for more powerful computers to be completed (in particular, the RAYDAC by Raytheon).

The machine used 2,300 vacuum tubes. It had 256 words of memory, using Williams tubes, with each word being 37 bits. It had only seven basic operations: add, subtract, and fixed-point multiply; comparison, data extraction, input and output. Several years later, drum memory was added.

When the SWAC was completed in August 1950, it was the fastest computer in the world. It continued to hold that status until the IAS computer was completed a year later. It could add two numbers and store the result in 64 microseconds. A similar multiplication took 384 microseconds. It was used by the NBS until 1954 when the Los Angeles office was closed, and then by UCLA until 1967 (with modifications). It was charged out there for $40 per hour.

In January 1952, Raphael M. Robinson used the SWAC to discover five Mersenne primes—the largest prime numbers known at the time, with 157, 183, 386, 664 and 687 digits.

Additionally, the SWAC was vital in doing the intense calculation required for the X-ray analysis of the structure of vitamin B12 done by Dorothy Hodgkin. This was fundamental in Hodgkin receiving the Nobel Prize in Chemistry in 1964.

== See also ==
- List of vacuum tube computers
