= Därdemänd =

Tatar poet

Zakir Sadíq ulı Rämiev
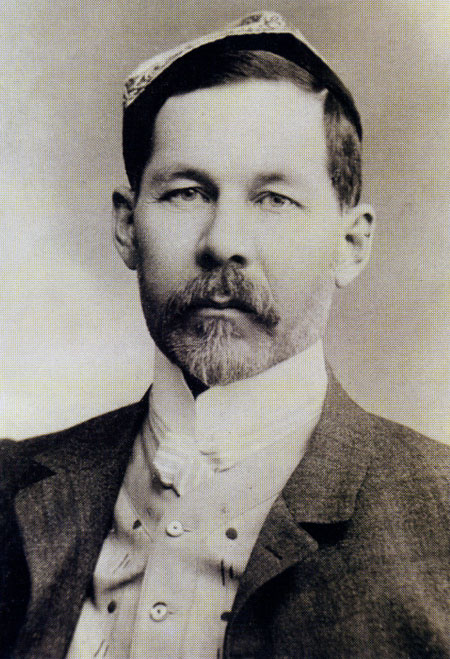
- Born: November 23, 1859; Zirgan, Meleuzovsky District
- Died: October 9, 1921 (aged 61); Orsk, Orenburg Oblast
- Other names: Därdemänd, Derdmend
- Occupations: Tatar poet, manufacturer and patron of arts
- Notable work: newspaper Vakit, literary magazine Şura

Zakir Sadíq ulı Rämiev (1859–1921, Tatar: Закир Садыйк улы Рәмиев Tatar pronunciation: [zæˈkir ræˈmiʲəf], Russian: Закир Садыкович Рамеев, Zakir Ramiyev) who used the pen name Därdemänd or Derdmend (Tatar: Дәрдмәнд, Tatar pronunciation: [dærdˈmænd]) was a famous Tatar poet, manufacturer and patron of arts. He was a founder of the newspaper Vakit (Waqıt) and the literary magazine Şura.

He is a major representative of classical Tatar literature. Because he came from an affluent family of the tzarist regime, he was persecuted by the Soviet administration and intentionally ignored as a poet, and his name and works were deleted from literary histories. His father was Muhammed Sadiq Rameev, the well-known gold-miner of the Ural Mountains.

== Life ==
Zakir Ramiev was born on November 23, 1859, in the village of Zirgan, Meleuz in the Ural Mountains, today situated within the autonomous republic of Bashkortostan of the Russian Federation. When he was three, his family moved to the village of Yulik, Baimak. His father, initially a merchant, amassed a great fortune after he got into gold-mining, and became one of the wealthiest persons in czarist Russia.

Educated at first at home, Zakir then attended with his brother Shakir the madrasa in Mullakay (Mullakayevo) known since with that name. In 1880, when his studies were over, he lived for a time in Istanbul (Constantinople), where he learned Turkish, got acquainted with Turkish literature and developed close ties with the Turkish literati.

His keen interest in literature led him to translate short stories from Turkish to Tatar and to write poetry. Unfortunately, except for Kargalılı Sibğatullah’a İthafen (In Dedication to Sibgatullah of Karga), none of the texts from this period are extant. His first poem to be published, "Days Long Past" (as the title would be in English) was inserted anonymously in the novella "Asma," published in 1903 by Rıza Fahretdin (Reza Fahretdinov).

The brothers Rameev were great philanthropists. They financed the building of over 100 mosques and acted as sponsors in a variety of fields. They started publishing in Orenburg the weekly Vakit (Time) in 1906 and the literary journal Şura (Council) in 1908 and allowed Tatar authors promoting democracy and progressive ideas to publish in these two publications. Derdmend himself had over forty poems published in the two periodicals during the period 1906-1912. After 1913 his works did not appear in periodicals.

Zakir Rameev was also a deputat at the Duma.

After the October 1917 Revolution he chose to remain in his native land. At first, he continued to live in Orenburg but then moved to Orsk with his family. As all his fortune had been confiscated he lived under very difficult conditions. He nevertheless went on writing and busying himself with literature. His legendary murmuring in French while walking in the Ural Mountains that startled the villagers so much must date from this period.

When he died on 9 October 1921 in Orsk, he left behind more than ten works of prose, and over a thousand verses of poetry. Unlike his brother Shakir who married many times, he had only one wife. The computing scientist Bashir Rameev was his grandson.

== Works ==
After he died, his poems were published in a number of books. His poetry, lyrical and philosophical, reveals a profound intellectuality and a high level of general culture. As the simplistic literary taste of Soviet ideology is being gradually discarded, believe experts, his poems are apt to serve as examples guiding all poets and authors in their creative endeavor in the post-Soviet period, whether they be Tatars or Turks in general.

Derdmend was commemorated in December 2009 on the 150th anniversary of his birth by a one-day conference at the National Museum and a gala night at the opera in Ufa, the capital of Bashkortostan. Attended by scholars and members of the Rameev family, the commemoration ended by various other ceremonies in Yulik and Zirgen.

== Family ==
Zakir Ramiev's son was mining engineer Iskandar Rameev. His grandson was Soviet inventor and scientist Bashir Rameev.

== Notes ==
- Габдрахман, Гариф-хаджи. Шейх Габдуллах ишан Мулаккайский. Уфа: Центральное духовное управление мусульман России, Российский исламский университет, 2012.
