= Bashir Rameev =

Soviet computer scientist (1918–1994)

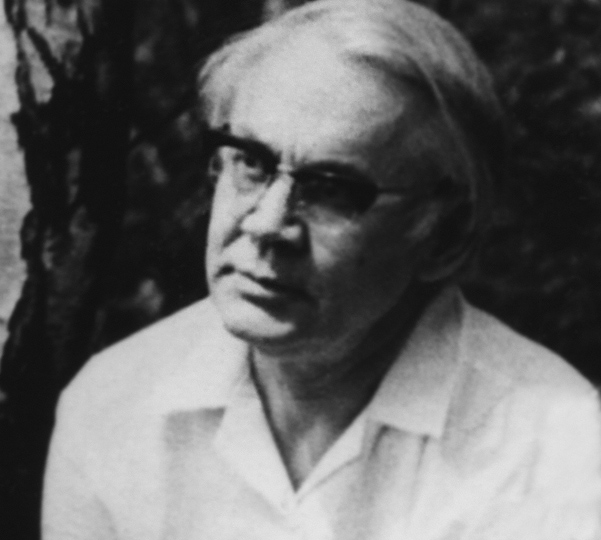
- Born: 1 May 1918; Baymak, Orsky Uyezd, Orenburg Governorate, Russian SFSR
- Died: 16 May 1994 (aged 76); Moscow, Russia
- Known for: First USSR patent in electronic computing; Strela computer; Ural computer series
- Awards: Stalin Prize
- Scientific career
- Fields: Computer scientist
- Workplaces: Academy of Sciences of the Soviet Union; Special Design Bureau-245 (Russian: СКБ-245); National Research Nuclear University "MEPhI"; Scientific Research Institute of Control Computers; USSR State Committee on Science and Technology

Bashir Iskandarovich Rameev (Russian: Баши́р Исканда́рович Раме́ев; formerly "Rameyev" in English; 1 May 1918 – 16 May 1994) was a Soviet inventor and scientist, one of the founders of Soviet computing, author of 23 patents, including the first patent in the field of electronic computers officially registered in the USSR—a patent for the Automatic Electronic Digital Machine (1948). Rameev's inventions paved the way for the development of a new field in Soviet science—electronic computing—and for the formation of a new branch of industry that supported it.

The central ideas incorporated in Rameev's invention of the electronic computer included: storing programs in computer memory, using binary code, utilizing external devices, and deploying electronic circuits and semiconductor diodes. The first publication about similar technology outside of the USSR appeared in 1949–1950. Rameev also suggested that intermediate computation data be automatically printed on punched tape and sent into the computer's arithmetic device for subsequent processing, meaning that the processing of commands would be performed in the computer's arithmetic device; this is usually referred to as the Von Neumann architecture.

Of particular note is Rameev's invention of diode-matrix control circuits, which were used to build his first brainchild, the first serially manufactured Soviet mainframe Strela (1954). In the 1950s, the diode-matrix control circuits were not widespread due to their significant dimensions and high power consumption. However, with subsequent development of microelectronics and the emergence of large-scale integrated circuits, which made possible to deploy tens or hundreds of thousands of diodes and transistors in a single piece of silicon, the concept of control circuits became viable and commonly used.

Strela computers carried out calculations in nuclear physics, rocketry and space research. Notably, one of the Strelas was used to calculate Sputnik orbit trajectory. For the development of Strela Rameev and his team were awarded the Stalin Prize of first degree, which was the highest Soviet award at that time.

Between 1956 and 1969, Rameev designed and oversaw the manufacturing of 14 different computers including: the multi-purpose Ural computer series and the specialized machines "Weather" ("Погода"), "Crystal" ("Кристалл"), "Granite" ("Гранит"), and "Coordinate" ("Координата"). Rameev's "famous computer family 'Ural' existed more than 15 years and had good chances to be one of the corner stones of future Russian computer engineering".

== Childhood and youth ==
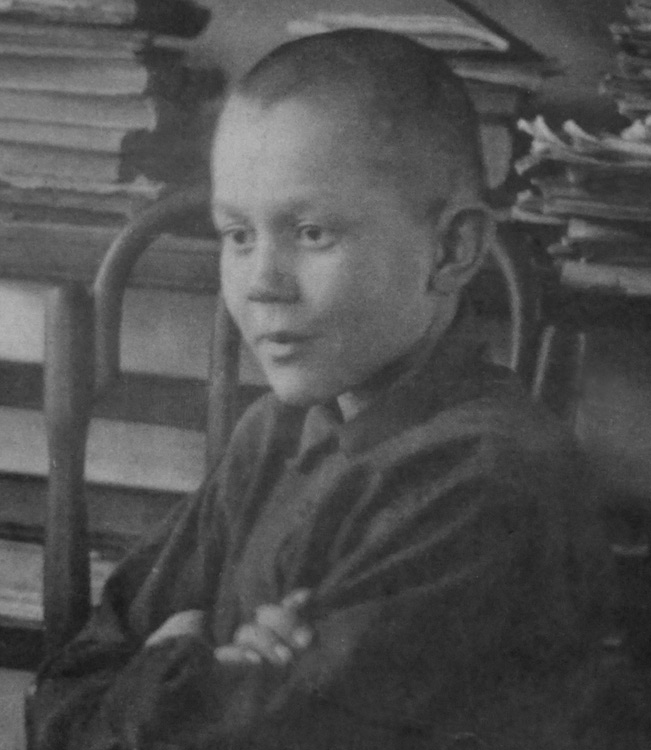
Bashir Rameev, 1929

Rameev's mother died when he was two. In 1938 his father was targeted by the Soviets and perished in labor camps during Stalinist purges. This branded Rameev, who was by then a sophomore at the Moscow Power Engineering Institute since 1937, as a son of "the enemy of the people". As a result, he faced coarse, overt and systematic discrimination, which began with university expulsion and job rejections and lasted until the breakout of World War II. Despite his impeccable record of service in the Soviet Army during World War II, Rameev encountered the same unfounded discrimination when he returned from the front. As the last resort, he wrote a letter to Joseph Stalin asking for help. Instead of helpful intervention, he was summoned to a phone call with a bureaucrat who told him "to live quietly and to not write again". It is then, at the age of 29, that Rameev realized that he had to do something extraordinary good for his country to prove that he and his family were not "the enemies of the people".

In 1935 Bashir became the youngest member of the Union of Inventors of the USSR at the age of 17.

== Awards ==
- Two Orders of the Red Banner of Labour

== Family ==
Bashir Rameev's grandfather is poet Därdemänd. His father was mining engineer Iskandar Rameev.

== Death ==
He died on May 16, 1994 in Moscow at the age of 77. He was buried at the Kuntsevo Cemetery.
