= Ural (computer) =

Series of Soviet-made mainframe computers

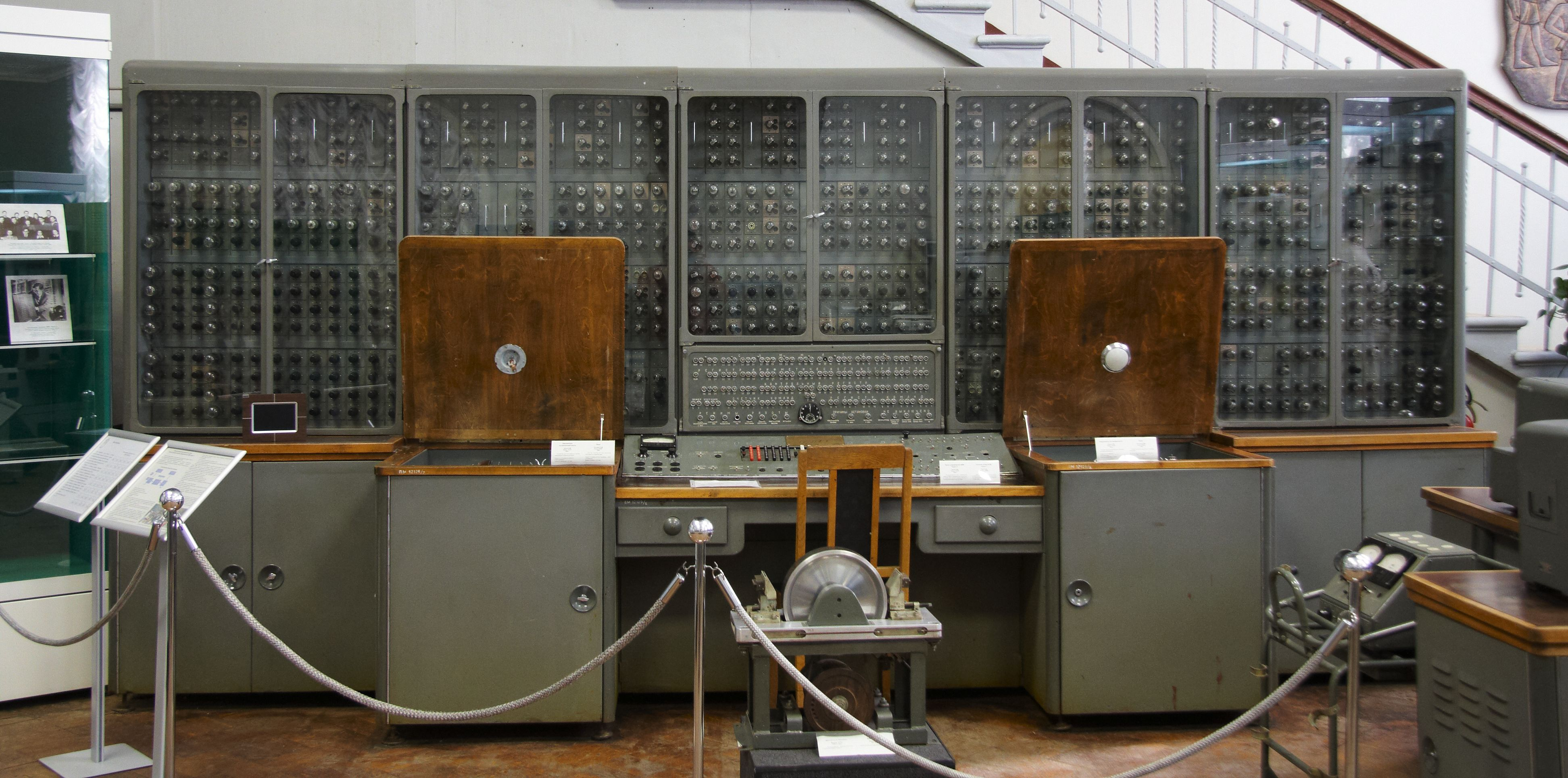
- Ural-1 front view
- Also known as: Урал
- Developer: Electronic Computer Producing Manufacturer of Penza
- Type: Mainframe computer
- Released: 1956; 70 years ago
- Lifespan: between 1956 and 1964
- CPU: Vacuum tubes (valves) @ 12,000 floating-point calculations per second
- Power: Three-phase electric power and a three-phase magnetic voltage stabiliser with 30kVA capacity
- Dimensions: approximately 90-100 square metres of space

Ural (Russian: Урал) is a series of mainframe computers built in the former Soviet Union.

== History ==
The Ural was developed at the Electronic Computer Producing Manufacturer of Penza in the Soviet Union and was produced between 1956 and 1964. The computer was widely used in the 1960s, mainly in the socialist countries, though some were also exported to Western Europe and Latin America. The Indian Statistical Institute purchased an Ural-1 in 1958.

When the University of Tartu received a new computer in 1965, its old Ural 1 was moved to a science-based secondary school, the Nõo Reaalgümnaasium, making the latter one of the first Soviet secondary schools to receive a computer. The name of the computer was also used to coin the first name for "computer" in Estonian, raal, in use until the 1990s until it was replaced by the word arvuti ("computer"). School 444 in Moscow, Russia started graduating programmers in 1960 and had the Ural computer operating by its students on-premises in 1965.

== Attributes ==
Models Ural-1 to Ural-4 were based on vacuum tubes (valves), with the hardware being able to perform 12,000 floating-point calculations per second. One word consisted of 40 bits and was able to contain either one numeric value or two instructions. Ferrite core was used as operative memory beginning with the Ural-2. A new series (Ural-11, Ural-14, produced between 1965 and 1971) was based on semiconductors.

It was able to perform mathematical tasks at computer centres, industrial facilities and research facilities. The device occupied approximately 90-100 square metres of space. The computer ran on three-phase electric power and had a three-phase magnetic voltage stabiliser with 30kVA capacity.

The main units of the system were: keyboard, controlling-reading unit, input punched tape, output punched tape, printer, magnetic tape memory, ferrite memory, ALU (arithmetical logical unit), CPU (central processing unit), and power supply.

== Models ==
Several models were released:

- Ural-1 – 1956
- Ural-2 – 1959
- Ural-3 – 1964
- Ural-4 – 1962
- Ural-11 – 1965
- Ural-14 – 1965
- Ural-16 – 1969

== Trivia ==
- Charles Simonyi, who was the second Hungarian in space, stated that he would take old paper tapes from his Soviet-built Ural-2 computer into space with him: he kept them to remind him of his past.

== See also ==
- Bashir Rameev, chief designer of the Ural series
- History of computing hardware
- List of vacuum tube computers
