= BUNCH =

Group of mainframe computer competitors by IBM

The BUNCH was the nickname for the group of mainframe computer competitors of IBM in the 1970s. The name is derived from the names of the five companies: Burroughs, UNIVAC, NCR, Control Data Corporation (CDC), and Honeywell. These companies were grouped together because the market share of IBM was much higher than all of its competitors put together.

During the 1960s, IBM and these five computer manufacturers, along with RCA and General Electric, had been known as "IBM and the Seven Dwarfs". The description of IBM's competitors changed after GE's 1970 sale of its computer business to Honeywell and RCA's 1971 sale of its computer business to Sperry (who owned UNIVAC), leaving only five "dwarves". The companies' initials thus lent themselves to a new acronym, BUNCH. International Data Corporation estimated in 1984 that BUNCH would receive less than $2 billion of an estimated $11.4 billion in mainframe computer sales that year, with IBM receiving most of the remainder. IBM so dominated the mainframe market that observers expected the BUNCH to merge or exit the industry. BUNCH followed IBM into the microcomputer market with their own PC compatibles. but unlike that company did not quickly adjust to retail sales of smaller computers.

Digital Equipment Corporation (DEC), at one point the second largest in the industry, was joined to BUNCH as DeBUNCH.

== Fate ==
=== Burroughs and UNIVAC ===
In September 1986, after Burroughs purchased Sperry (the parent company of UNIVAC), the name of the company was changed to Unisys.

=== NCR ===
In 1982, NCR became involved in open systems architecture, starting with the UNIX-powered TOWER 16/32, and placed more emphasis on computers smaller than mainframes. NCR was acquired by AT&T Corporation in 1991. A restructuring of AT&T in 1996 led to its re-establishment on 1 January 1997 as a separate company. In 1998, NCR sold its computer hardware manufacturing assets to Solectron and ceased to produce general-purpose computer systems.

=== Control Data Corporation ===
In 2000, Control Data Corporation became Syntegra (USA), a subsidiary of British company BT Group's BT Global Services.

=== Honeywell ===
In 1991, Honeywell's computer division was sold to French computer company Groupe Bull.

== Other mainframe manufacturers during the 1960s and 1970s ==
- Bendix Corporation introduced the G-15 in 1956 and the G-20 in 1961, with the G-21 shortly afterwards. Control Data Corporation purchased the Bendix computer division in 1963.
- Philco sold military computers as well as the commercial TRANSAC S-1000 and TRANSAC S-2000; Ford Motor Company purchased Philco in December 1961.
- Scientific Data Systems (later known as Xerox Data Systems after its purchase by Xerox in 1969) also sold mainframe computers, but with around 1% market share, it was not a major factor in the marketplace. Xerox closed the division in 1975, with most rights sold to Honeywell.
- In 1976, Cray Research (a company supported by Seymour Cray's former employer Control Data Corporation), released the Cray-1 vector computer.
- Digital Equipment Corporation (DEC) was founded in 1957 to manufacture computer components, and made many mainframe computers, notably the PDP-6 and PDP-10 series. DEC later sold to Compaq, which was acquired by Hewlett-Packard.
- Hewlett-Packard (HP) was founded in 1939 manufacturing advanced electronic equipment. In the mid-1960s HP started producing minicomputers, which competed with mainframe computers.
- Amdahl Corporation, founded in 1970 by IBM Fellow, chief architect of the IBM System/360 range and entrepreneur, Gene Amdahl, was an information technology company specializing in IBM mainframe-compatible computer products, and became a wholly owned subsidiary of Fujitsu in 1997.
- International Computers Limited was a large British computer hardware, computer software and computer services company that operated from 1968 until 2002. The company was progressively acquired by Fujitsu, and in April 2002 it was rebranded as Fujitsu.
