= Strela computer =

Soviet mainframe computer

- Also known as: ЭВМ Стрела (arrow)
- Developer: Yuri Bazilevsky (chief designer) and Bashir Rameyev (main inventor) at the Special Design Bureau 245 in Moscow
- Manufacturer: Moscow Plant of Computing-Analytical Machines (счетно-аналитических машин)
- Type: Mainframe computer
- Released: 1953; 73 years ago
- Units sold: 7
- CPU: 6200 vacuum tubes and 60,000 semiconductor diodes @ 2000 operations per second
- Memory: Williams tube memory (2048 words)

Strela computer (Russian: ЭВМ Стрела, lit. 'Arrow') was the first mainframe vacuum-tube computer manufactured serially in the Soviet Union, beginning in 1953.

== Overview ==
This first-generation computer had 6200 vacuum tubes and 60,000 semiconductor diodes.

Strela's speed was 2000 operations per second. Its floating-point arithmetic was based on 43-bit floating point words, with a signed 35-bit mantissa and a signed 6-bit exponent.

Operative Williams tube memory (RAM) had 2048 words. It also used read-only semiconductor diode memory for programs. It used punched cards or magnetic tape for data input and magnetic tape, punched cards and/or wide printer for data. The last version of Strela used a 4096-word magnetic drum, rotating at 6000 rpm.

While Yury Bazilevslky was officially Strela's chief designer, Bashir Rameyev, who developed the project prior to Bazilevsky's appointment, could be considered its main inventor. Strela was constructed at the Special Design Bureau 245 (Argon R&D Institute since 1986) in Moscow.

Strelas were manufactured by the Moscow Computing-Analytical Machine Plant (счетно-аналитических машин) (Russian: Московский завод счётно-аналитических машин имени В. Д. Калмыкова) during 1953–1957; 7 copies were manufactured. They were installed in the Computing Centre of the USSR Academy of Sciences, Keldysh Institute of Applied Mathematics, Moscow State University, and in computing centres of some ministries related to defense and economic planning.

In 1954, the designers of Strela were awarded the Stalin Prize of 1st degree (Bashir Rameyev, Yu. Bazilevsky, V. Alexandrov, D. Zhuchkov, I. Lygin, G. Markov, B. Melnikov, G. Prokudayev, N. Trubnikov, A. Tsygankin, Yu. Shcherbakov, L. Larionova).

The impetus for the development of Strela was a BBC broadcast heard by Bashir Rameyev about the American development of ENIAC.

== See also ==
- History of computer hardware in Eastern Bloc countries
- List of vacuum-tube computers
