= Axel Wenner-Gren =

Wealthy Swedish entrepreneur (1881-1961)

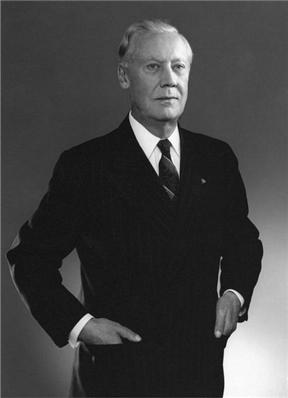
Axel Wenner-Gren

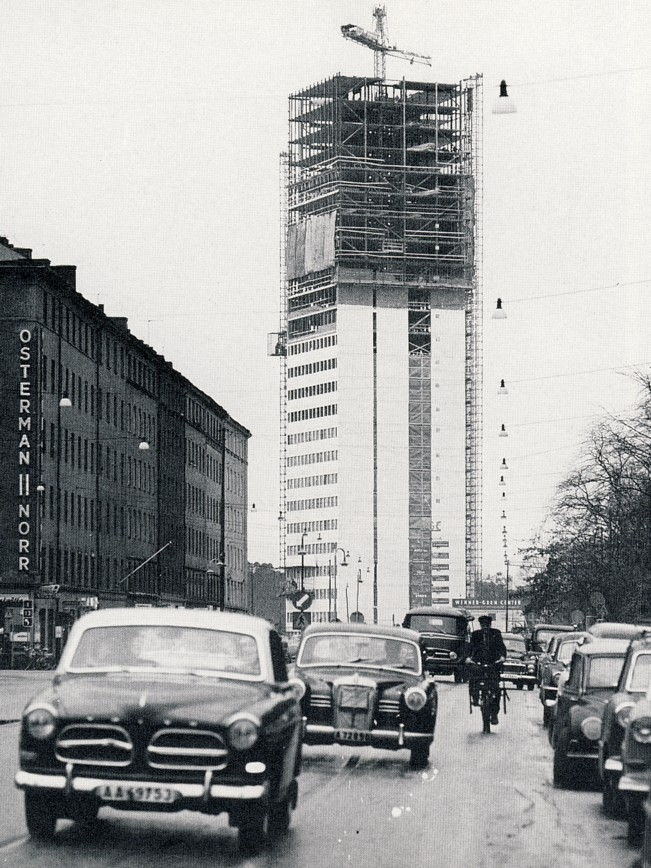
Wenner-Gren Center, Stockholm, 1960

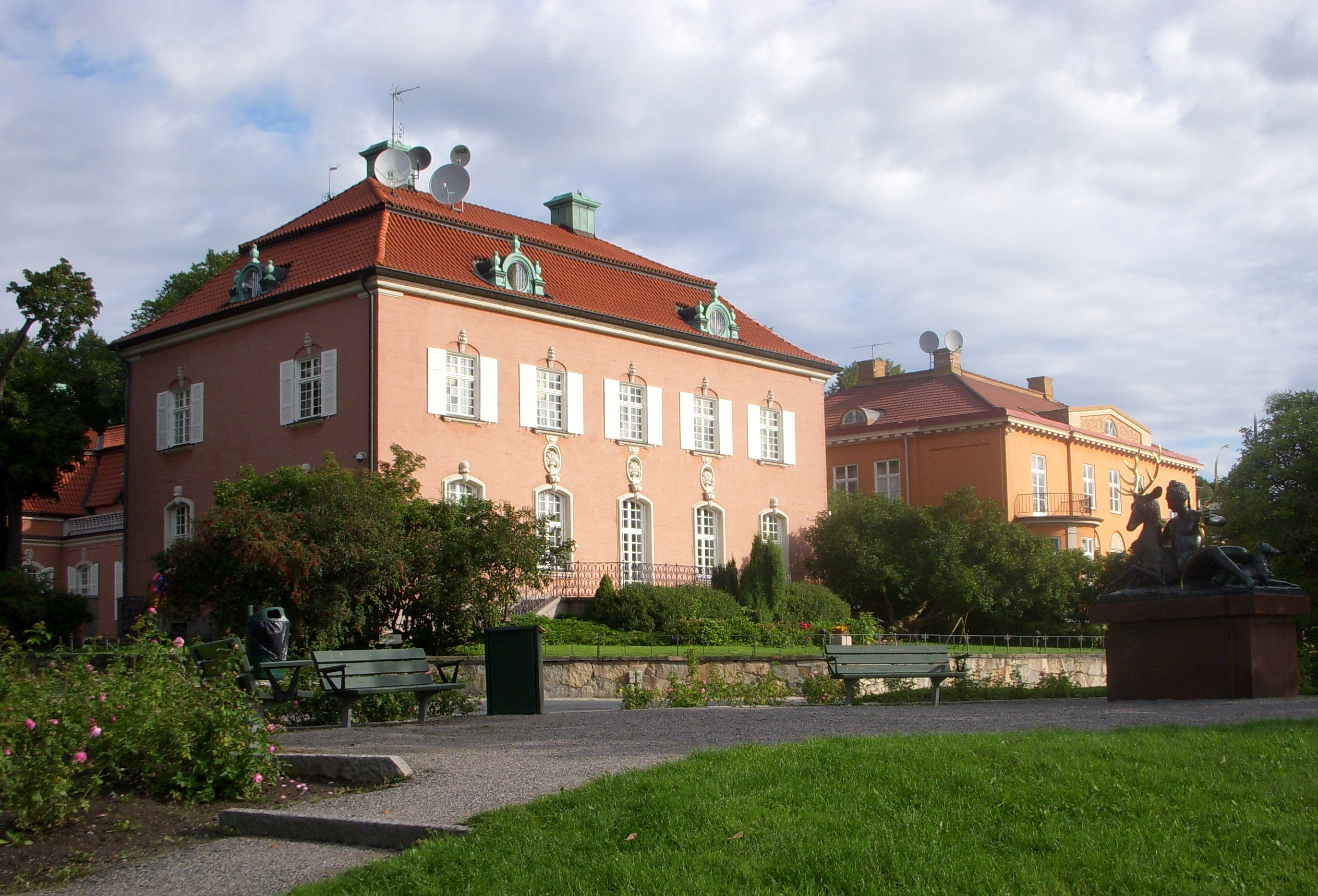
"Wenner-Gren palace", Diplomatstaden, Stockholm, 2008

Axel Lennart Wenner-Gren (5 June 1881 – 24 November 1961) was a Swedish entrepreneur and one of the wealthiest men in the world during the 1930s.

== Early life ==
Wenner-Gren was born on 5 June 1881 in Uddevalla, a town on the west coast of Sweden. He was the fourth of six children (four girls and two boys) born to Leonard and the much younger Alice Wenner-Gren (née Albin); only three of the children survived to adulthood: Axel, his oldest sister (Anna), and his younger brother (Hugo). His father owned a farm and exported timber to England, which made the family wealthy.

Having spent his school years in Uddevalla, Wenner-Gren moved to Gothenburg where he was employed for five years in the spice importing company of a maternal uncle. During this time, he learned English, French, and German at the local Berlitz school, and music at the local YMCA. In 1902, at the age of 21, he left Sweden to further his studies in Germany. He first studied in the university town of Greifswald, where he took some summer courses before moving on to Berlin, where he studied at the Berliner Handelsakademie, from which he graduated early.

== Career ==
After some difficulty, he found work with the German subsidiary of Alfa Laval Separator where he developed skills as a salesman, before quitting in 1904 to work selling agricultural machinery near Stuttgart which, with financial support from his father, had become his first financial enterprise.

In 1908, he traveled to America where he learned about engines for agricultural use, returning to Europe the same year. While in Vienna in 1908 he saw the Santo vacuum cleaner in the shop of Gustaf Paalen who had exclusive rights to distribute them throughout Europe. After initially failing to become a European distributor for the Santo vacuum cleaner in his own right, he entered into a partnership with Paalen, purchasing a twenty percent interest in the company.

Earlier in his life he notably collaborated with Fredrik Ljungström.

Wenner-Gren amassed a fortune from his early insight that the industrial vacuum cleaner could be adapted for domestic use. Soon after the First World War he persuaded the Swedish lighting company (called Lux at the time, but with his suggestion to rename it to Electrolux) for which he then worked (securing the contract to floodlight the opening ceremony of the Panama Canal, among other successes), to buy the patent to a home vacuum cleaner. He asked that instead of compensating him in cash, he would receive company stock based on the sales of the vacuum cleaner. The Electrolux cleaner was so successful that by the early 1930s, Wenner-Gren had become the majority owner of Electrolux, and the firm was a leading brand in both vacuum cleaner and refrigerator technology.

Wenner-Gren also diversified his interests into the ownership of newspapers, banks and arms manufacturers, and acquired many of the holdings of the disgraced safety-match tycoon Ivar Kreuger. In Mexico in the 1930s, he was in economic alliance with Maximino Ávila Camacho, strongman of the Mexican state of Puebla, whose brother Manuel Ávila Camacho became President of Mexico in 1940.

== World War II blacklisting ==
Wenner-Gren was reported to be a friend of Hermann Göring, whose first wife was a Swede, and in the late 1930s convinced himself that he could avert the coming world war by acting as a conduit between Göring and the British and American governments. His efforts proved unsuccessful, with all parties regarding him as a self-promoting nuisance without much influence on the plans of the Nazi regime. However, others are suspicious of his role in the war, citing how (his) original Bank of the Bahamas was used to fund the Nazis and his friendship with Göring as potential proof of his private support for the Nazis.

A disconsolate Wenner-Gren retired to his estate in The Bahamas, in Hog Island (now Paradise Island), where he resumed his friendship with the islands' governor, the Duke of Windsor, and former King of the United Kingdom, Edward VIII. Early in the war his rumored friendship with Göring and the German sympathies of the Duke led first the Americans and, following their lead, the British, to place him on an economic blacklist, enabling them to freeze his assets in Nassau.

There proved to be little or no foundation to their suspicions that Wenner-Gren was a Nazi agent, notwithstanding the appearance of his steam yacht Southern Cross (the world's largest at the time) along with ships from the Allied Navies at the site of the sinking of the liner SS Athenia on the first day of the war. Wenner-Gren's yacht Southern Cross rescued over three hundred survivors of the sinking and transferred some to nearby Allied ships and others continued to the U.S.

== Other ventures ==
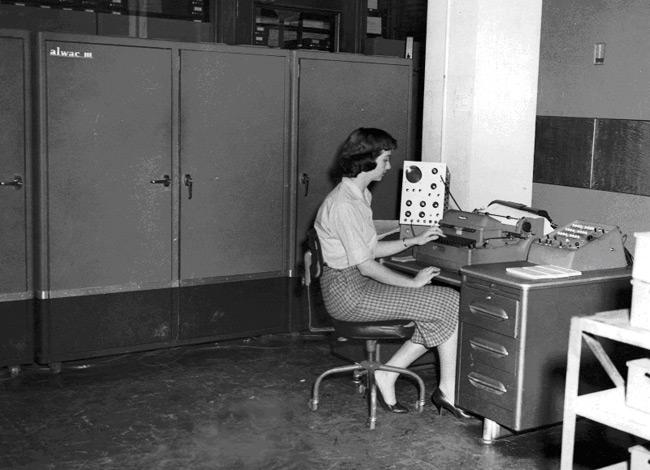
Alwac III computer

In the 1950s, Wenner-Gren also got involved in the early computer business. For a railroad project connecting California with Alaska, he got in touch with Glenn Hagen, previously an engineer with Northrop Aircraft, who had founded Logistics Research in Redondo Beach outside Los Angeles, developing computers based on magnetic drum memory. In November 1952, Wenner-Gren helped the company to incorporate. He soon controlled the company and renamed it ALWAC (the Axel L. Wenner-Gren Automatic Computer). ALWAC I was used in 1953, ALWAC II and ALWAC III in 1954, ALWAC III-E in 1955. In 1956 and 1957, the model ALWAC III-E was considered a competitor to the IBM 650, having fewer parts and good economy, but no more than 30 units seem to have been delivered. Soon after this, magnetic drum machines were made obsolete by the introduction of the magnetic core memory.

By 1956 the number of employees tripled to over 300 and the company was relocated to an industrial park in Hawthorne, California. The appearance of the transistor in the electronics industry in 1957 was a financial shock for all vacuum tube computer makers and by 1958 ALWAC in Hawthorne closed and its employees, with the help of Wenner-Gren himself, were successfully hired by Litton Industries and Autonetics and several smaller electronics companies. The follow-up ALWAC 800 was a failed design that never went beyond prototype, using not only core memory but also magnetic logic (a combination of semiconductor diodes and magnetic cores, cf. Hewitt Crane), and presold contracts nearly ruined the company.

Development was transferred to Sweden in 1958. The next model, named Wegematic 1000, a slight upgrade of the III-E, was shipped in 1960. Only a dozen were delivered and half of them were give-aways to universities, including one unit for the Weizmann Institute in Israel. In exchange, Wenner-Gren received several honorary titles.

Among Wenner-Gren's other interests were monorail train systems. His company, ALWEG, built the original Disneyland Monorail System in 1959 and the Seattle Center Monorail in 1962. Wenner-Gren continued his fascination with speculative railway projects, as he collaborated with Canadian W.A.C. Bennett to build a railway north from Prince George into the untapped Peace River, Rocky Mountain Trench and eventually Alaska. Parts of the railway were built by the Pacific Great Eastern Railway after Wenner-Gren's death, including the needless Fort Nelson branch, yet the meeting produced outcomes lasting to this day. The interest in the north spurred a spate of mega-industrial projects in the region: the Bennett Dam flooding vast valleys, gas pipelines and plants at Taylor, coal mines and pulp mills.

== Personal life ==
In late 1909, while returning from a trip to America on board a trans-Atlantic liner, he met Marguerite Gauntier Liggett who had been born on 15 October 1891 in Kansas City, Missouri. She was traveling with her sister, actress Gene Gauntier, to Europe to complete her musical training as an opera singer. After a brief romance at sea, they traveled to London, where they married on 14 December 1909 before traveling on to Berlin where she would complete her studies.

Wenner-Gren died of cancer while staying at the Red Cross Hospital in Stockholm.

=== The Viking Fund ===
Wenner-Gren also founded and endowed The Viking Fund in 1941, an organization supporting anthropological research. In 1941, the endowment funded the Wenner-Gren Aeronautical Research Laboratory, now called the Wenner-Gren Laboratory at the University of Kentucky. The lab has since changed its focus to Biomedical Engineering. The Viking fund was later renamed the Wenner-Gren Foundation for Anthropological Research.

== See also ==
- Wenner-Gren Center
- Electrolux
