= ALWAC III-E =

Vacuum-tube computer

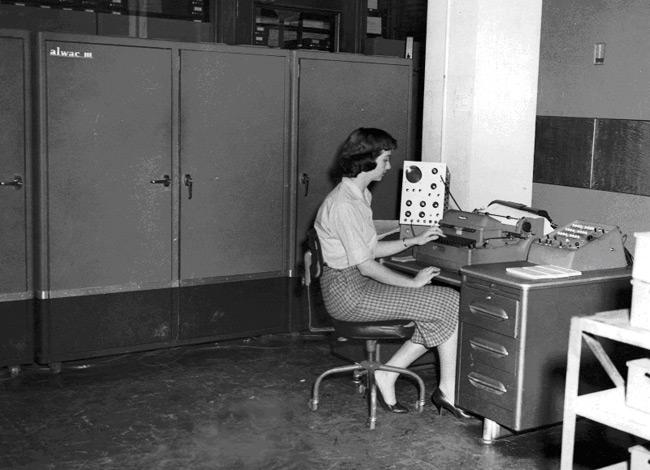
Programmer Irma Lewis at the console of the Alwac III computer, 1959.

The ALWAC III-E or Wegematic 1000 was an early commercial vacuum-tube computer employing a rotating magnetic drum main storage unit, operational in 1955. It weighed about 1,000 kilos and was manufactured first in Los Angeles by Logistics Research / Alwac Corporation, then in Tyresö, Sweden by Alwac AB.

The ALWAC III-E contained 132–275 vacuum tubes, 5000–5400 silicon diodes, and cost $60,000–$80,000. Word size was 32 bits + sign + recoverable overflow bit. Instruction execution times (including average memory access times) were 5.25–5.75 milliseconds for addition and subtraction, and 21.25 ms for multiplication and division. The added letter E in the model name stood for the E-register (index register).

== Business background ==
The ALWAC computer line originated in a need for railway signalling technology. In 1953, the Swedish industrialist Axel Wenner-Gren started the company Alweg-Forschung GmbH in Fühlingen near Cologne. It went on to deliver the Disneyland monorail (1959) and the Seattle Center Monorail (1962). Wenner-Gren had also bought the Long Island Rail Road which needed a modern signalling system. The elderly industrialist had no insight into computer technology, but at the advice of Glenn Hagen, he decided to manufacture his own computers for this purpose.

Wenner-Gren bought into Logistics Research Inc. in the Los Angeles suburb of Redondo Beach, a young company that made drum memory computers under the brands Aslap and Float. At one point, the firm produced manuals for the ALWAC III computer that still carried the Logistics Research brand, but eventually it was renamed the Alwac Corporation. The invention of the ALWAC models was attributed, as an honorific gesture, to the company's new owner. The name was derived from Axel Leonard Wenner-Gren Automatic Computer. As of 2026, the degree to which the ALWAC line was a continuation or even a re-branding of an Aslap or Float design had not been determined.

== Delivered units ==
There is no evidence that any ALWAC I model was brought to market. The first commercial product in the company's new line, the ALWAC II, was delivered in June 1954 to the Swedish Navy's aerodynamics lab. It was followed in December 1955 by the ALWAC III, and finally by the ALWAC III-E or Wegematic 1000.

An ALWAC III-E was installed at the University of British Columbia in March 1957 and remained in service until October 1961. Others were installed at Oregon State University and Loyola Marymount University. One was installed by the CIA in September, 1957 in the offices of the Photographic Intelligence Division, which used the ALWAC to analyse pictures taken by U-2 spy planes.

== The end of the ALWAC line ==
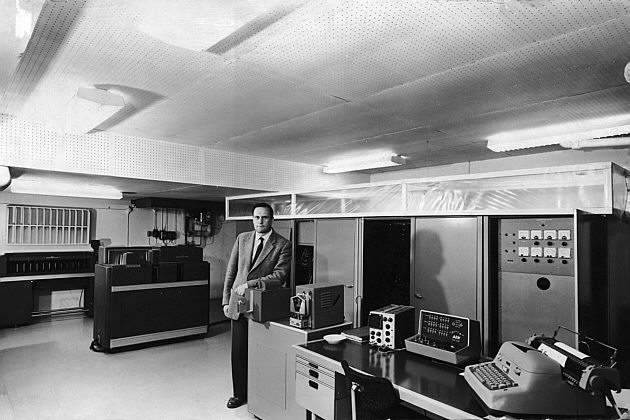
Finnish physicist Kalervo Vihtori Laurikainen at Turku Computing Center with a Wegematic 1000 computer.

In 1957, Wenner-Gren started a Swedish computer company, Alwac AB. The American Alwac Corp went bankrupt in 1958 and was bought up by El-Tronics Inc.. Manufacture of the ALWAC III-E moved to Tyresö near Stockholm, where the model was re-named Wegematic 1000. About ten machines were delivered from October 1958 on as donations to institutions in the Nordic countries. This included the first electronic computer in Finland, the first computer at Oslo University and the first electronic one at Chalmers in Gothenburg. The protoype of a successor model, the ALWAC 800, was shipped from the US to the Tyresö plant, but continued development stalled and it never came to market. Wenner-Gren died in 1961 aged 80. Alwac AB ceased operations and the Tyresö plant was sold to Ericsson.

== The ALWAC'S memory ==
"The arithmetic registers of the ALWAC computer are circulating loops of information one word in length. The information is changed when the magnetic writing head is switched to an input device or to some reading head other than the one which makes up the loop with it. In addition to four one-word registers, the drum has four 32-word channels of working storage from which instructions are picked up to be carried out and data picked up to be operated on in the arithmetic registers. The working storage, through what is essentially a loop arrangement, has faster access than the remainder of the drum, the main storage. ... Main storage consists of 128 channels, 32 words in each. Any main-storage channel may be copied in a block to one of the working-storage channels, and a working-storage channel may be copied in a block to any main channel."
