= NCR 304 =

1950s transistor-based computer

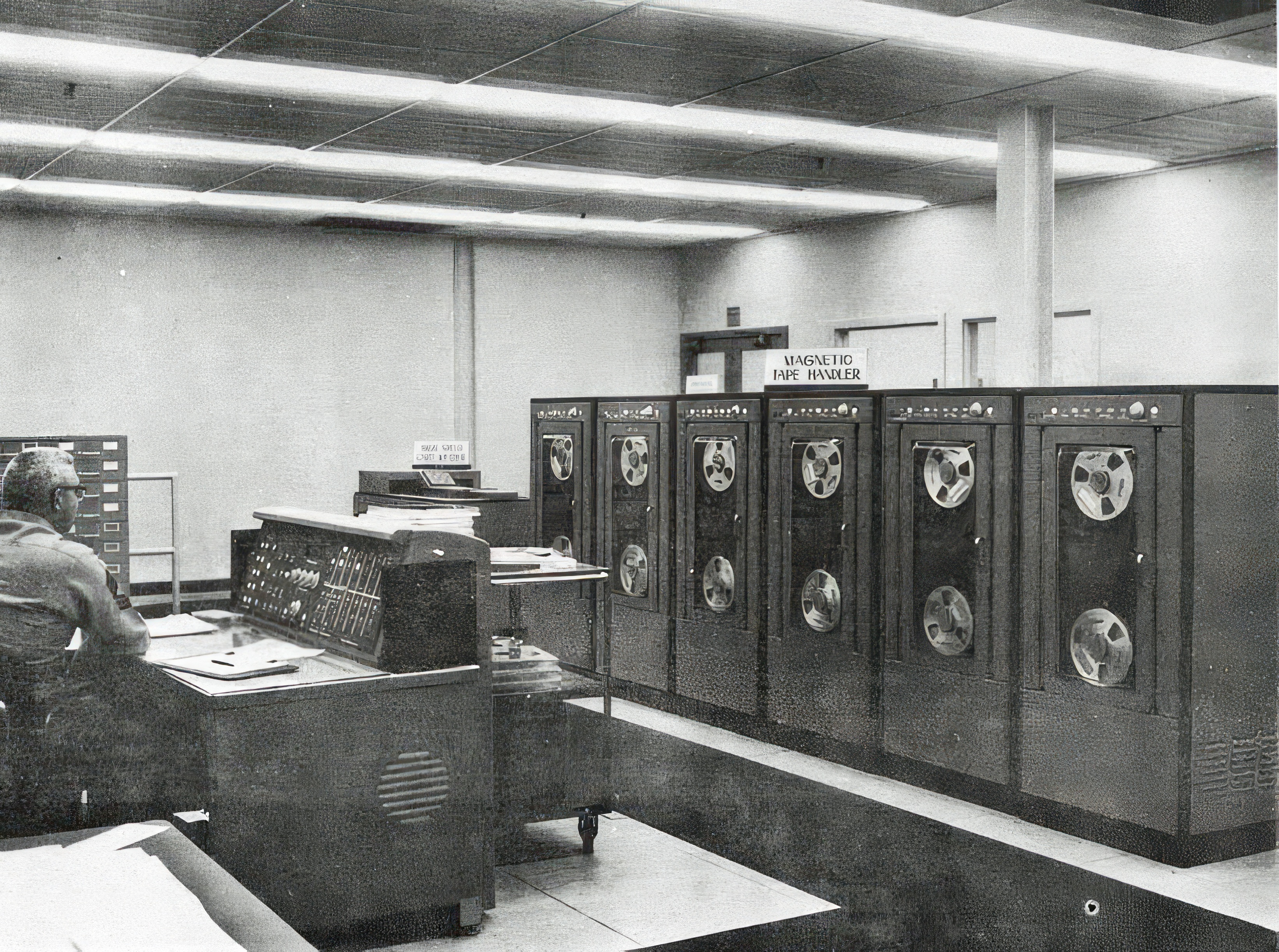
NCR 304 computer system Camp Pendleton, California

The NCR 304 computer, announced in 1957, first delivered in 1959, was National Cash Register (NCR)'s first transistor-based computer. The 304 was developed and manufactured in cooperation with General Electric, where it was also used internally.

Its follow-on was the NCR 315.

== See also ==
- Computer architecture
- Electronic hardware
- Glossary of computer hardware terms
- Harwell CADET
- History of computing hardware
- List of computer hardware manufacturers
- Manchester Transistor Computer
- Metrovick 950
- Transistor
