= Darmstadt Electronic Computing Machine =

The Darmstadt Electronic Computing Machine (DERA), (German:Darmstädter Elektronischer Rechenautomat) was an experimental, room-sized electronic computer calculator with vacuum tube built in 1951. It was built at the Technische Universität Darmstadt under the direction of Alwin Walther. The first operation was in 1957, with development completed in 1959.

== Technical data ==
- Start of construction in 1950/51, start of use in 1957, completed in 1959
- Programming languages: in addition to machine code also ALGOL.
- I / O device: telegraph (paper tape reader).
- Word machine with George Stibitz, from George Stibitz (also excess - 3 code), 20 bit (13 decimal places + sign)
- Command length 7 digits
- Drum memory with 3000 words
- Ferrite core register (20 ms access time)
- Clock frequency 200 kHz (addition 0.8 ms; multiplication 12 - 16 ms)
- Components: 1,400 tubes, 8,000 diodes, 90 relays

== See also ==
- CAB 500
- Carousel memory (magnetic rolls)
- Karlqvist gap
- Manchester Mark 1
