= Preannouncement =

Announcement that happens before usual time

A preannouncement occurs when a company or individual announces something either prior to the time that they do it or prior to the time that they would normally announce it. Preannouncements can take the form of a press release, filing a form with the government, a conference call, or a webcast.

== Corporate earnings ==
The most common use of the term in the U.S. investing community is for a statement about earnings that are materially different from the expectation of financial analysts or from prior guidance given by the company. These preannouncements seem to have become more frequent in the U.S. since the effective date of Regulation FD. On average, they are made about 20 calendar days before the scheduled announcement or Earnings Call. There are now usually a few hundred such preannouncements every quarter.

The period during which preannouncements tend to be made is sometimes called the "confessional season" because so many of them are bad news.

It has been argued that in the U.S. a preannouncement of earnings during a quarter does not need to be furnished to the Securities and Exchange Commission (SEC) on a Form 8-K, but that a preannouncement after the quarter ends must be.

It has been suggested that potential litigation costs are one reason for announcing bad news early - the company may be at risk of being sued for having known the bad information, not having revealed it, and causing a loss to those who bought stock after the company knew. There are indeed more preannoucements of bad news than of good news, and the number of preannouncements increased in the mid-1990s in the wake of an increased threat of shareholder lawsuits. Firms in industries more subject to litigation are more likely to preannounce. The more analysts cover a stock, the more likely the firm is to preannounce, and good preannouncements average releasing half the good news while bad preannouncements average releasing all of the bad news.

== Other types ==
- The first article here is an example of an unusual preannouncement of bad news about expected government action.
- Companies trading in the U.S. are required to preannounce stock buyback programs before they begin buying shares, and then to report on such programs in their quarterly and annual filings.
- There have been proposals that insiders be required to preannounce all of their stock trades. They are currently required to preannounce certain types of stock trades.
