= RAYDAC =

Early electronic computer

The RAYDAC (for Raytheon Digital Automatic Computer) was a one-of-a-kind computer built by Raytheon. It was started in 1949 and finished in 1953. It was installed at the Naval Air Missile Test Center at Point Mugu, California. The RAYDAC used 5,200 vacuum tubes and 18,000 crystal diodes. It had 1,152 words of memory (36 bits per word), using delay-line memory, with an access time of up to 305 microseconds. Its addition time was 38 microseconds, multiplication time was 240 microseconds, and division time was 375 microseconds. (These times exclude the memory-access time.)

== See also ==
- List of vacuum-tube computers
