= Datatron =

Early family of computers

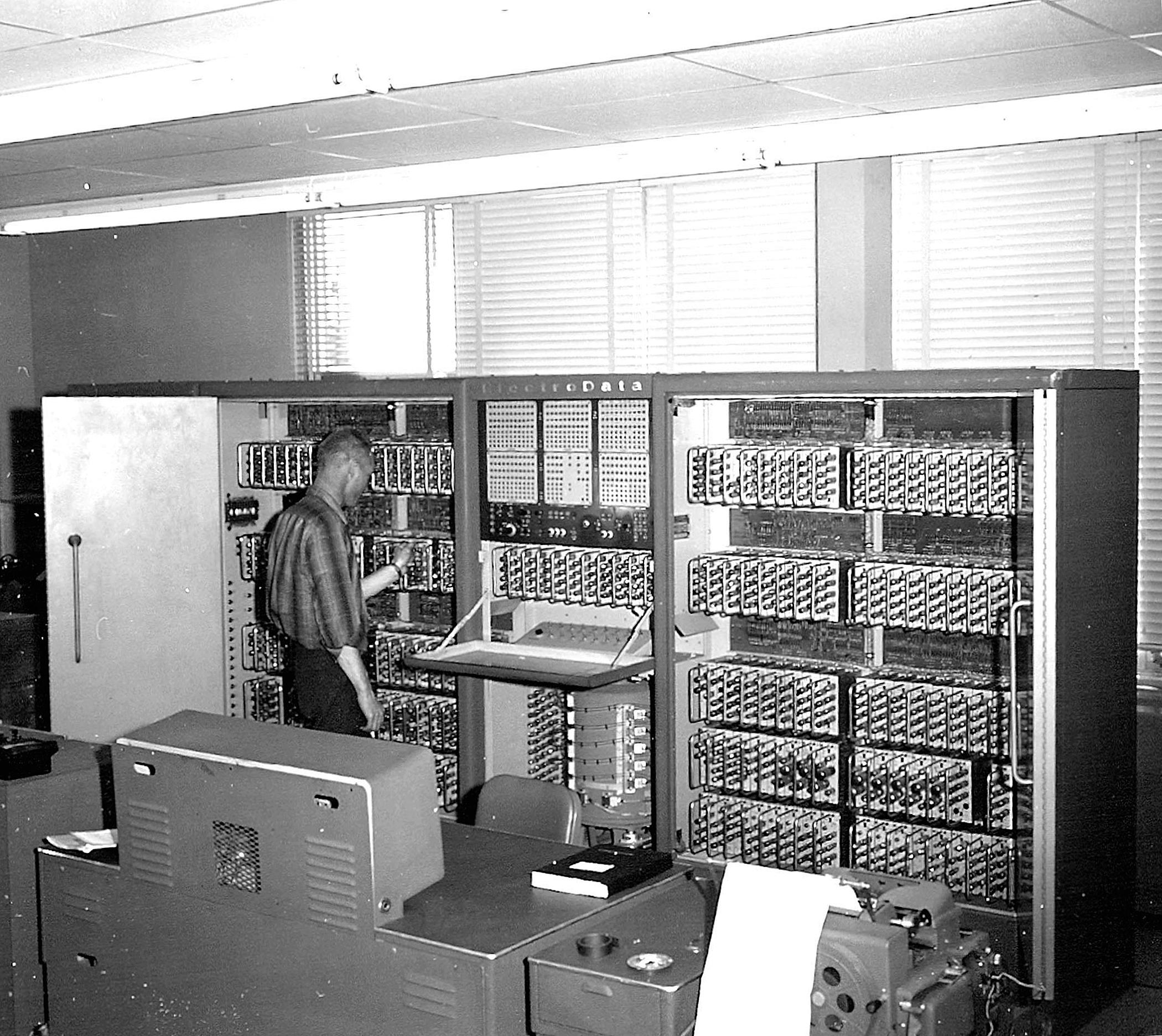
Datatron-205 computer at the U.S. Geological Survey

The Datatron is a family of vacuum tube computers, developed by ElectroData Corporation, that used internal decimal operations and first shipped in 1954. The Datatron was later marketed by Burroughs Corporation after Burroughs acquired ElectroData in 1956. The Burroughs models of this machine were still in use into the 1960s.

== History ==
Consolidated Engineering Corporation (CEC), ElectroData's parent corporation, first pre-announced the Datatron in 1952 as the "CEC 30-201". Known also as CEC 30-203 (ElectroData 203), ElectroData 204 or 205, Burroughs 205 (different names signify the development and addition of new peripherals).

After investigating the possibilities, a site visit was made to Consolidated Engineering Corporation (CEC) in Pasadena and the CEC Model 30-203 digital computer... was eventually selected. The prototype at CEC was given the project number 36-101. JPL and the National Bureau of Standards were the first two customers to order the computer – the one ordered by JPL was 36-102, and the one for NBS was 36-103.

— Slice of History: JPL's First Digital Computer, Jet Propulsion Laboratory (NASA)

The first systems were equipped with an "Electrodata 203" processor and were shipped to JPL and the National Bureau of Standards (NBS) in 1954. That same year design began on the "30-240" processor, enhanced to support magnetic tape. The name "Datatron" was first used in 1955.

== Description ==
The Datatron has a word size of ten decimal digits plus a sign. Character data occupies two digits per character. A magnetic drum is used for memory. The drum rotates at 3570 rotations per minute (RPM) and stores 4000 words on 20 tracks (called bands). It weighed about 3,175 pounds (1.6 short tons; 1.4 t). A later model, the Burroughs 220, added a small amount of magnetic core memory. A later model, the Datatron 205 was sold by Burroughs as the Burroughs 205.

== Algebraic Compiler ==
- A joint committee of American and European scientists met in Zurich to create a universal language called IAL (International Algebraic Language).
- IAL was renamed ALGOL 58 (Algorithmic Language 1958).
- It was intended to be a "machine-independent" language, but because it was so new, there were no compilers yet to actually run it on any computers.

Knuth and his team authored the Burroughs Algebraic Compiler for the 205, featuring high-level programming and documentation. This was one of the earliest implementations of an ALGOL-style language on a commercial system, enabling programmers to write mathematical formulas that the machine would then translate into its decimal-based machine code.

In the early 1960s, the Datatron 205 became a platform for the development of early compilers and assemblers at the Case Institute of Technology. Most notably, Donald Knuth developed two assembly systems for the machine: EASY (Elegant Assembly System) and MEASY (Modified EASY).

Feature	Standard ALGOL (General)	ALGOL 205 (Datatron)
Base Version	ALGOL 58 / ALGOL 60	Specifically ALGOL 58
I/O Support	None (left to implementers)	Custom commands for 205 card readers and printers
Main Use	Academic publication of algorithms	Scientific and engineering tasks at Caltech/JPL
Architecture	Abstract / Universal	Optimized for Decimal (BCD) and the 205's B-Register
