= Consolidated Engineering Corporation =

- Founded: 1937
- Founder: Herbert Hoover Jr.
- Headquarters: Pasadena, California, United States
- Products: Analytical Instruments

Consolidated Engineering Corporation was a chemical instrument manufacturer from 1937 to 1960 when it became a subsidiary of Bell and Howell Corp.

== History ==
CEC was founded in 1937 by Herbert Hoover Jr., eldest son of former United States president Herbert Hoover, as sole proprietor. Harold Washburn was hired in 1938 as VP for Research, with a mandate to develop instruments applicable to petroleum prospecting.

Like his father, Hoover had trained as a mining engineer at Stanford University, studying under Washburn. He earned a PhD in Electrical Engineering from California Institute of Technology in 1932. His thesis Professor was Ernest Lawrence, a physicist at the University of California, Berkeley. Four physicists from California Institute of Technology were hired into the Research Department in a project to develop a mass spectrometer. The initial product was the 21-101 Mass Spectrometer delivered in December 1942, installed in early 1943, initial price $12,000, with no options.

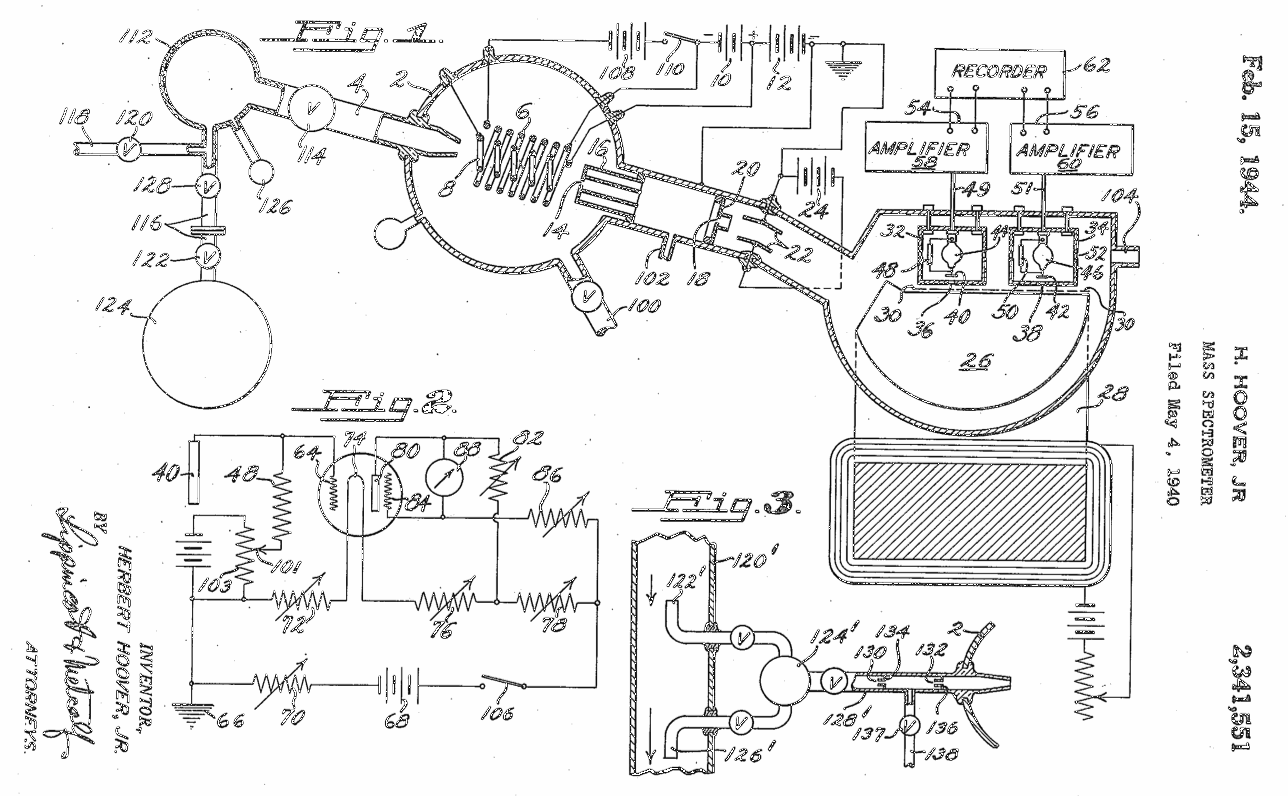
Consolidated Engineering Corporation Mass Spectrometer, Patent 2341551

CEC became a publicly held corporation in 1945, with Hoover selling all of his stock. Philip Fogg became President. In 1955, the name was changed to Consolidated Electrodynamics, because some states required that a service engineer for an engineering company be a licensed engineer in that state.

The mass spectrometer products and other analytical instrument products were separated from other product lines into the “Chemical Instruments” department, a business marketing department, sometime between 1945 and 1948 with Harold Wiley as Manager for Chemical Instruments.

In 1949 Clifford Berry (Chief Physicist in R&D) began work on a specialized "Equation Solver", the 30-103 Analog Computer, to handle the complex linear equations generated by the mass spectrometers that were designed by R&D.

The Chemical Instruments Department became the Analytical and Control Division in about 1959 with Harold Wiley as General Manager. This name was later changed to the Analytical Instruments Div.

Year	Event	Corporate Name
1937	Founded by Herbert Hoover Jr. as a subsidiary of United Geophysical.	Consolidated Engineering Corp.
1945	Becomes a publicly traded company; Hoover sells his stock.	Consolidated Engineering Corp.
1952	CEC creates a "Computer Division" to build the 30-201 and 30-203.	Consolidated Engineering Corp.
1954	The Computer Division is spun off as a separate company: ElectroData Corp.	Consolidated Engineering Corp. (Parent)
1955	Name Change: Rebranded because some states required "Engineering" firms to be led by licensed professional engineers.	Consolidated Electrodynamics Corp.
1956	CEC loses its computer wing when Burroughs acquires ElectroData.	Consolidated Electrodynamics Corp.
1960	CEC merges with Bell & Howell, becoming a subsidiary.	Consolidated Electrodynamics Corp.

=== Acquisition by Bell ===
CEC became a subsidiary of Bell & Howell in 1960. In 1968 the CEC Corporation was dissolved and CEC became the Electronics Instrument Group of Bell and Howell. In the mid-1970s the Analytical Instruments Division of Bell and Howell was sold to the Instrument Division of duPont.

Over the years, mass spectrometry proved to be a widely used and powerful analytical technique and a variety of laboratory instruments became available from several companies. DuPont abandoned the analytical instruments business in the late 1970s, however, CEC's mass spectrometer heritage did not end there.

Physicist Ferdinand Zegel operates a Model 21-130 mass spectrometer made by Consolidated Electrodynamics Corporation, April 1961

=== Consolidated Systems Corporation ===
In the mid-1950s, CEC had split off a subsidiary, Consolidated Systems Corporation, to produce custom instruments and systems. Lawrence G. Hall carried CEC mass spectrometer know-how to CSC and led their team to put the first mass spectrometer in space on a National Aeronautics and Space Administration upper atmosphere research satellite, Explorer 17, in 1963. Nine more satellites and the Pioneer Venus spacecraft carried CSC magnetic sector and quadrupole mass spectrometer analyzers built for NASA's Goddard Space Flight Center.

In 1967, this business became Perkin-Elmer Corporation's Applied Sciences Division (ASD), located in Pomona. ASD mass spectrometers monitored the respiratory function of returning Apollo astronauts and were evaluated in NASA and U.S. Navy test programs for manned atmosphere monitoring. They were deployed on Skylab (the first U.S. space laboratory), Apollo–Soyuz (the first joint U.S.-U.S.S.R. space mission), Space Shuttle/Spacelab flights and two more USN submarines. ASD research instruments also flew on two Mars Viking Landers in 1976, analyzing the Martian atmosphere and searching for chemical signs of life in its soil.

In the early 1970s, General Manager Bliss M. Bushman led ASD's expansion as a manufacturer of mass spectrometer-based submarine atmosphere monitors and commercial products. Their Central Atmosphere Monitoring System, now in its third generation, has been standard equipment on U.S. Navy submarines for over three decades. Their commercial industrial chemical monitors are sold throughout the world today under Hamilton Sundstrand's Applied Instrument Technologies banner. They are deployed in the petrochemical, pharmaceutical, steel and oil refining industries, among others.

ASD became Orbital Sciences Corporation's Sensor Systems Division in 1993 and developed the Major Constituent Analyzer for the International Space Station's atmosphere. SSD was sold again in 2001, becoming Hamilton Sundstrand Space, Land and Sea, Pomona Site, a few months after SSD's MCA began continuous on-orbit operation aboard Space Station. The company is updating and expanding the MCA for Orion, NASA's new crewed spacecraft.

Along with Oak Ridge National Laboratories, they developed an ion trap mass spectrometer chemical detection system for chemical warfare agents, and these units are now being deployed on U.S. Army reconnaissance vehicles. When fitted for bio-aerosol sampling, CBMS II has also demonstrated effective biological warfare agent detection.
