= Alice Burks =

American author of books about the history of electronic computers

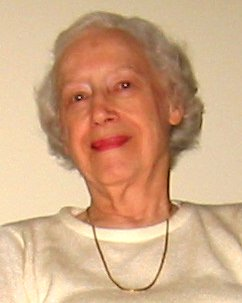
Alice Burks in 2001

Alice Burks (née Rowe, August 20, 1920 – November 21, 2017) was an American author of children's books and books about the history of electronic computers.

== Early life and education ==
Burks was born Alice Rowe in East Cleveland, Ohio, in 1920. She began her undergraduate degree at Oberlin College on a competitive mathematics scholarship and transferred to the University of Pennsylvania in Philadelphia where she completed her B.A. in mathematics in 1944. During this period, she was employed as a human computer at the University of Pennsylvania's Moore School of Electrical Engineering.

== Career ==
Burks retired from full-time employment after marrying Moore School lecturer Dr. Arthur Burks, a mathematician who served as one of the principal engineers in the construction of the ENIAC, the world's first general-purpose electronic digital computer, built at the Moore School between 1943 and 1946. Unlike some of the Moore School women computers, she never worked directly with the ENIAC.

At the conclusion of Arthur's work with the Moore School and at the Institute for Advanced Study in 1946, Burks moved with her husband to Ann Arbor, Michigan, where he joined the faculty of the University of Michigan and helped to found the computer science department. She returned to school, earning an M.S. in educational psychology in 1957 from Michigan.

Starting in the 1970s following the decision of Honeywell v. Sperry Rand, the federal court case that invalidated the ENIAC patent, she and husband Arthur championed the work of John Vincent Atanasoff, the Iowa State College physics professor whom the court had ruled invented the first electronic digital computer (a machine that came to be called the Atanasoff–Berry Computer) and from whom the subject matter of the ENIAC was ruled to be derived. In articles and two books, the first co-authored with Arthur, Mrs. Burks sought to bolster the judge's decision and highlight testimony and evidence from the case. This pitted the Burkses in a deeply acrimonious controversy against exponents of ENIAC inventors John Mauchly and J. Presper Eckert.

Burks later lived in Ann Arbor, Michigan, where she was assisting her husband Arthur Burks with writing his memoirs and preparing his papers for university donation. Arthur died on May 14, 2008. Burks died in November 2017 at the age of 97.

== Works ==
- Burks, Arthur W.; Alice R. Burks (October 1981). "The ENIAC: First General-Purpose Electronic Computer". Annals of the History of Computing. 3 (4): 310–399. doi:10.1109/MAHC.1981.10043. ISSN 1058-6180. S2CID 14205498.
- Burks, Alice R.; Arthur W. Burks (1988). The First Electronic Computer: The Atanasoff Story. Ann Arbor, Michigan: The University of Michigan Press. ISBN 0-472-10090-4.
- Burks, Alice R. (2003). Who Invented the Computer?: The Legal Battle That Changed History. foreword by Douglas R. Hofstadter. Amherst, New York: Prometheus Books. ISBN 1-59102-034-4.

=== Children's books ===
- Burks, Alice R.; Shirley McLaughlin (illustrator) (1983). Leela and the Leopard Hunt. Methuen Publishing Ltd. ISBN 978-0-416-23130-4.
