= Arthur Burks =

American mathematician

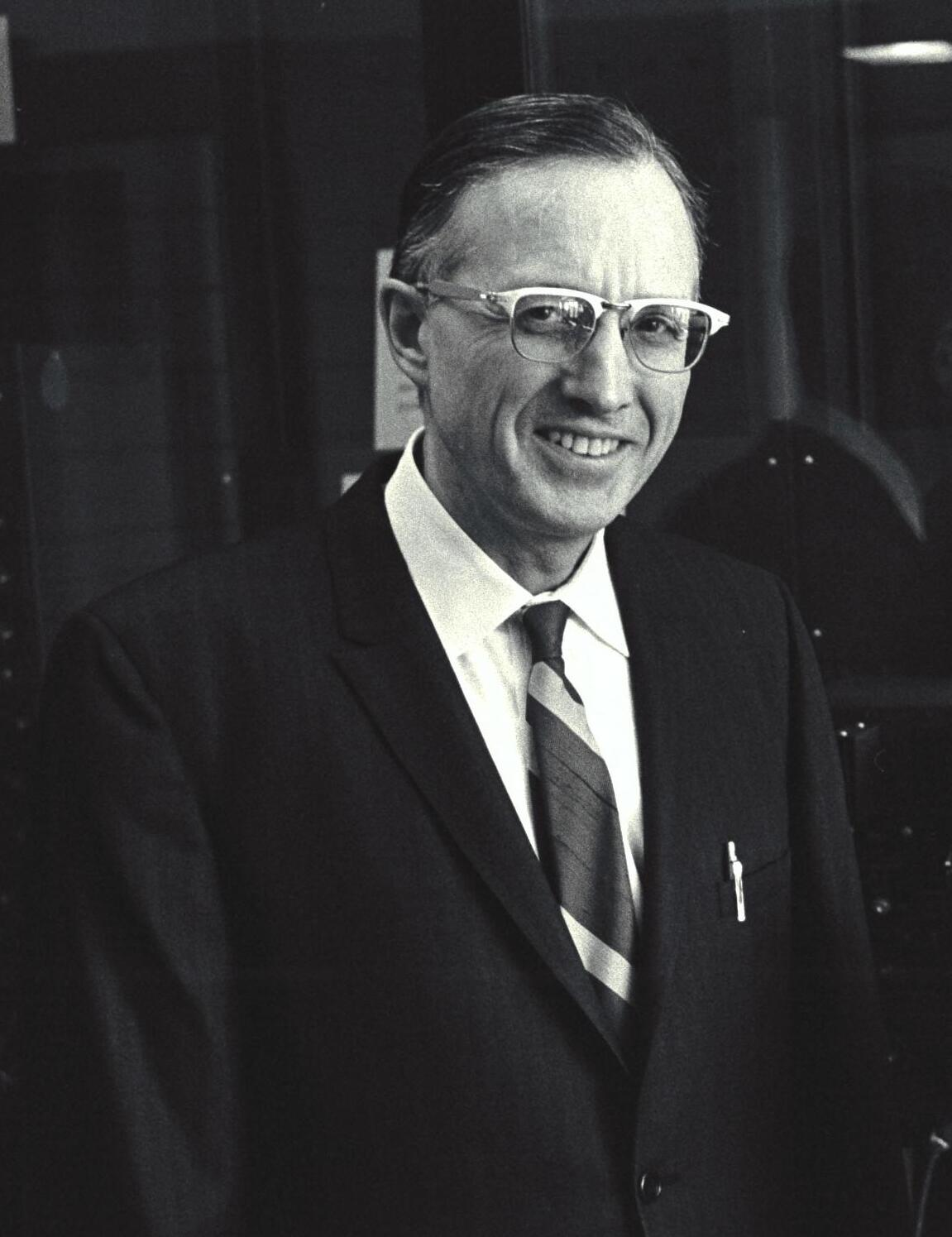
- Burks in 1971
- Born: Arthur Walter Burks; October 13, 1915; Duluth, Minnesota, U.S.
- Died: May 14, 2008 (aged 92); Ann Arbor, Michigan, U.S.
- Education: DePauw University (BA, 1936); University of Michigan (MA, 1937; PhD, 1941)
- Notable work: Contribution to the design of the ENIAC
- Scientific career
- Doctoral advisor: Cooper Harold Langford
- Doctoral students: John Henry Holland

Arthur Walter Burks (October 13, 1915 – May 14, 2008) was an American mathematician who worked in the 1940s as a senior engineer on the project that contributed to the design of the ENIAC, the first general-purpose electronic digital computer. Decades later, Burks and his wife Alice Burks outlined their case for the subject matter of the ENIAC having been derived from John Vincent Atanasoff. Burks was also for several decades a faculty member at the University of Michigan in Ann Arbor.

== Early life and education ==
Burks was born in Duluth, Minnesota. He earned his B.A. in mathematics and physics from DePauw University in Greencastle, Indiana, in 1936 and his M.A. and Ph.D. in philosophy from the University of Michigan in Ann Arbor in 1937 and 1941, respectively.

== The Moore School ==
The summer after obtaining his Ph.D., Burks moved to Philadelphia, Pennsylvania, and enrolled in the national defense electronics course offered by the University of Pennsylvania's Moore School of Electrical Engineering; his laboratory teaching assistant was J. Presper Eckert, a graduate student at the Moore School; a fellow student was John Mauchly, the chairman of the physics department at Ursinus College in nearby Collegeville, Pennsylvania. Both Burks and Mauchly sought and obtained teaching positions at the Moore School the following fall, and roomed together throughout the academic year.

=== ENIAC ===
When Mauchly and Eckert's proposed concept for an electronic digital computer was funded by the U.S. Army's Ballistics Research Laboratory in June 1943, Burks was added to the design team. Among his principal contributions to the project was the design of the high-speed multiplier unit. (Also during this time, Burks met and married Alice Rowe, a human computer employed at the Moore School.)

In April 1945, with John Grist Brainerd, Burks was charged with writing the technical reports on the ENIAC for publication. Also during 1945 Burks assisted with the preliminary logical design of the EDVAC in meetings attended by Mauchly, Eckert, John von Neumann, and others.

Burks also took a part-time position as a philosophy instructor at Swarthmore College during 1945–1946.

== Institute for Advanced Study ==
On March 8, 1946, Burks accepted an offer by von Neumann to join the computer project at the Institute for Advanced Study in Princeton, New Jersey, and joined full-time the following summer. (Already on the project was another member of the ENIAC team, Herman Goldstine. Together, Goldstine and Burks gave nine of the Moore School Lectures in Summer 1946.) During his time at the IAS, Burks worked to expand von Neumann's theory of automata.

== University of Michigan ==
After working on this project, Burks relocated to Ann Arbor, Michigan, in 1946 to join the faculty of the University of Michigan, first as an assistant professor of philosophy, and as a full professor by 1954. With Irving Copi he sketched the necessary design for general purpose computing.

Burks helped found the university's computer science department, first as the Logic of Computers group in 1956, of which he was the director, then as a graduate program in 1957, and then as an undergraduate program within the new Department of Computer and Communication in 1967, which he chaired until 1971. He declined a position heading up a different university's computing center, citing his primary interest as the purely theoretical aspects of computing machines. He was awarded the Louis E. Levi Medal in 1956.

Burks' doctoral students include John Holland, who in 1959 was the first student to receive a Ph.D. in computer science from Michigan, and possibly the first in the world.

Burks served as president of the Charles S. Peirce Society in 1954–1955. He edited the final two volumes (VII–VIII), published 1958, of the Collected Papers of Charles Sanders Peirce and, over the years, wrote published articles on Peirce.

=== Restoration of parts of the ENIAC ===
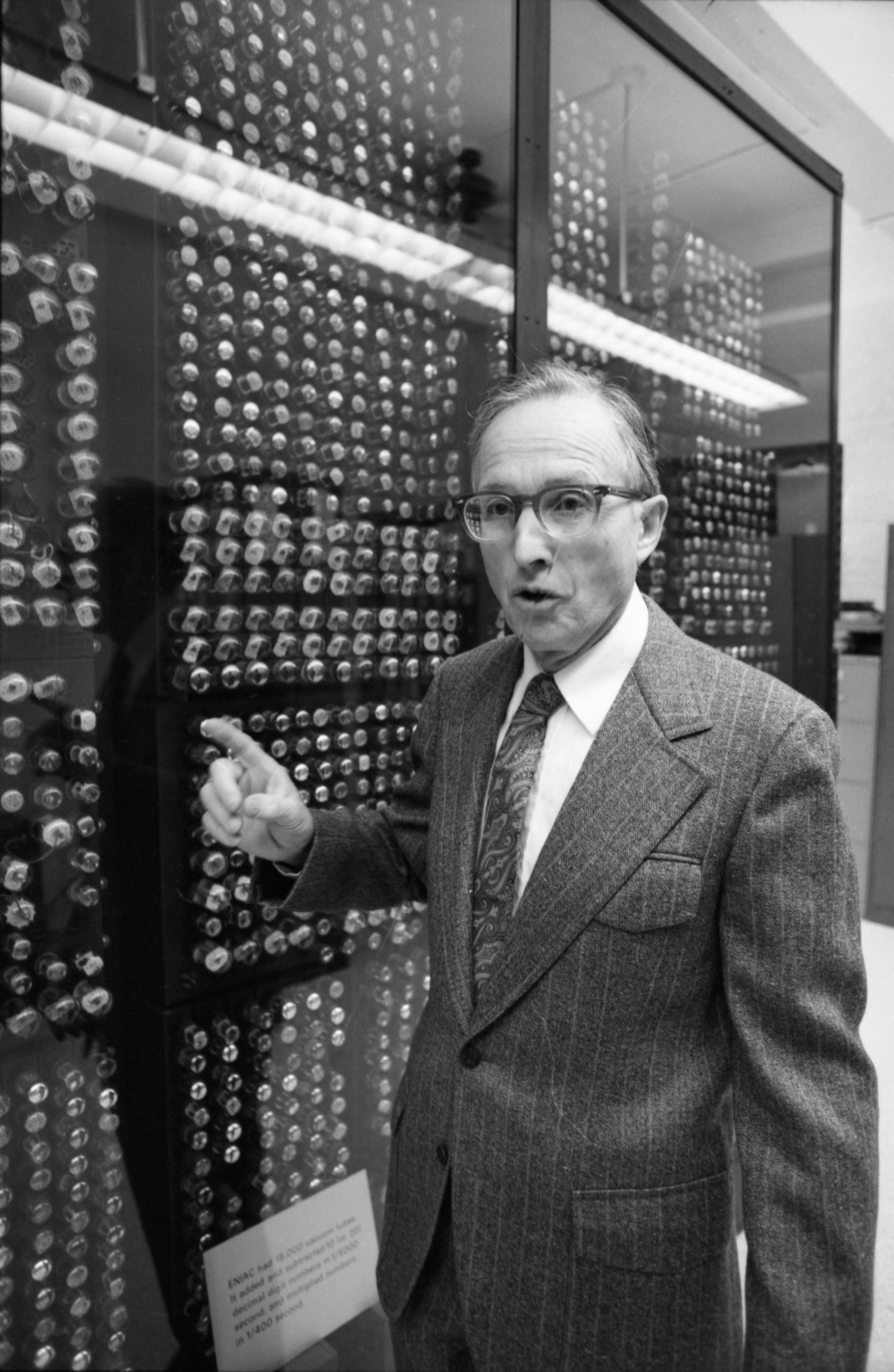
Burks with a section of ENIAC at the University of Michigan in 1982

In the 1960s he was presented with the opportunity to acquire four units of the original ENIAC, which had been rusting in a storage Quonset hut in Aberdeen, Maryland. He ran the units through a car wash before restoring them and donating them to the University of Michigan. They are currently on display in the entryway of the Computer Science Building.

=== Patent dispute ===
In 1964 Burks was approached by attorney Sy Yuter and asked to join T. Kite Sharpless and Robert F. Shaw in litigation that would add their names as inventors to the ENIAC patent, which would allow them to profit from the sale of licenses to the premiere electronic digital computer apart from Sperry Rand, the company that owned the Eckert-Mauchly interest in the patent and was at that time seeking royalties from other computer manufacturers. This endeavor was never successful; in the 1973 decision to Honeywell v. Sperry Rand, U.S. District Judge Earl R. Larson ruled—even as he invalidated the patent—that only Mauchly and Eckert had invented the ENIAC, and that Burks, Sharpless, and Shaw could not be added as inventors.

=== BACH Group ===
In the 1970s Burks began meeting with Bob Axelrod, Michael Cohen, and John Holland, researchers with interests in interdisciplinary approaches to studying complex adaptive systems. Known as the BACH group (an acronym of their surnames), it came to include, among others, Pulitzer Prize winner Douglas Hofstadter, evolutionary biologist William Hamilton, microbiologist Michael Savageau, mathematician Carl Simon and computer scientists Reiko Tanese, Melanie Mitchell and Rick Riolo. The BACH group continues to meet irregularly as part of the University of Michigan's Center for the Study of Complex Systems (CSCS).

In the 1970s and 1980s Burks, working with his wife Alice, authored a number of articles on the ENIAC, and a book on the Atanasoff–Berry Computer.

=== As professor emeritus ===
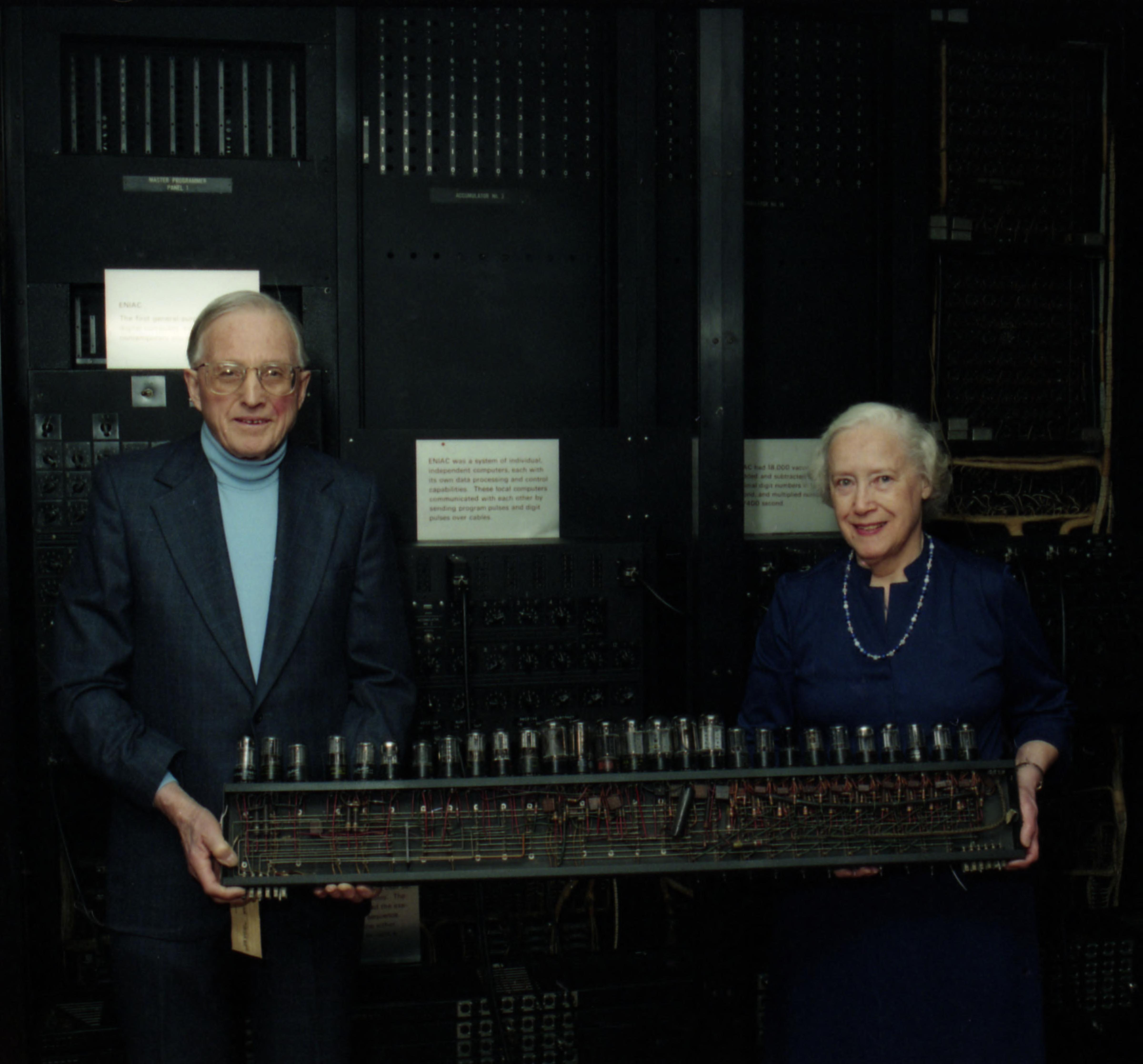
Arthur and Mary Burks with a piece of ENIAC in 1996

In 1990, Burks donated a portion of his papers to the university's Bentley Historical Library, where they are accessible to researchers.

Burks died May 14, 2008, in an Ann Arbor, Michigan, nursing home from Alzheimer's disease.

== Awards ==
- 2023: Stibitz-Wilson Award from the American Computer & Robotics Museum

== Works ==
- Burks, Arthur W., Goldstine, Herman H., and von Neumann, John (1946), Preliminary discussion of the logical design of an electronic computing instrument, 42 pages, Institute for Advanced Study, Princeton, New Jersey, June 1946, 2nd edition 1947. Eprint.
- Burks, Arthur W. and Wright, Jesse Bowdle (1952), Theory of Logical Nets. Amazon says: published by Burroughs Adding Machine Co.; Google Books says: published by University of Michigan Engineering Research Institute; 52 pages. Deep Blue Eprint.
- Burks, Arthur W. and Copi, Irving M. (1954), The logical design of an idealized general-purpose computer, Amazon says: published by Burroughs Corporation Research Center; Google Books says: published by University of Michigan Engineering Research Institute, 154 pages. Deep Blue Eprint.
- Burks, Arthur W. (1956), The logic of fixed and growing automata, Engineering Research Institute, University of Michigan, 34 pages.
- Burks, Arthur W. and Wang, Hao (1956), The logic of automata, Amazon says: published by Air Research and Development Command; Google Books says: published by University of Michigan Engineering Research Institute; 60 pages. Deep Blue Eprint.
- Peirce, Charles Sanders and Burks, Arthur W., ed. (1958), the Collected Papers of Charles Sanders Peirce Volumes 7 and 8, Harvard University Press, Cambridge, MA, also Belknap Press (of Harvard University Press) edition, vols. 7-8 bound together, 798 pages, online via InteLex, reprinted in 1998 Thoemmes Continuum.
- Burks, Arthur W. (1971), Essays on Cellular Automata, University of Illinois Press, 375 pages.
- Burks, Arthur W. (1978), Review of The New Elements of Mathematics by Charles S. Peirce, Carolyn Eisele, ed., in the Bulletin of the American Mathematical Society, vol. 84, no. 5, September 1978, Project Euclid Eprint PDF 791KB.
- Burks, Arthur W. (1978). Chance, Cause and Reason: An Inquiry into the Nature of Scientific Evidence. Chicago, IL and London: University of Chicago Press. ISBN 9780226080871 – via Internet Archive.
- Burks, Arthur W. and Burks, Alice R. (1981), "The ENIAC: First General-Purpose Electronic Computer" in Annals of the History of Computing, vol. 3, no. 4, October 1981, pp. 310–399.
- Burks, Arthur W. (1986), Robots and free minds, College of Literature, Science, and the Arts, University of Michigan, 97 pages.
- Burks, Alice R.; Arthur W. Burks (1988). The First Electronic Computer: The Atanasoff Story. Ann Arbor, Michigan: The University of Michigan Press. ISBN 0-472-10090-4 – via Internet Archive.
- Burks, Arthur W. (1996), "Peirce's evolutionary pragmatic idealism", Synthese, Volume 106, Number 3, 323–372.

A number of articles by Arthur W. Burks are listed on page 599 in index of Studies in the Logic of Charles Sanders Peirce by Nathan Houser, Don D. Roberts, James Van Evraof, Google Book Search Beta page 599.

== See also ==
- Mantissa
- Reverse Polish notation
