= White House Task Force =

White House Task Force may refer to:

- Presidential task force
- White House Coronavirus Task Force
- White House Task Force to Protect Students from Sexual Assault
- White House Task Force on Women's Rights and Responsibilities
- White House Economic Task Force (see Great American Economic Revival Industry Groups)
