= Presidential task force =

A presidential task force or White House task force is a board of advisors appointed by the president of the United States whose main purpose is to enact policies in relation to responding to either national emergencies, crises, or general policy initiatives. Presidential task force members are part of the Executive Office of the President of the United States who don't require United States Senate confirmation and can be dismissed at the discretion of the president. This is granted by the Constitution of the United States under Article Two, Section Two, Clause One, stating, "require the Opinion, in writing, of the principal Officer in each of the executive Departments, upon any Subject relating to the Duties of their respective Offices."

== List of presidential task forces ==
=== Richard Nixon ===
- White House Task Force on Women's Rights and Responsibilities (1969)

=== Ronald Reagan ===
- President's Task Force on Private Sector Initiatives (1981–1982)
- President's Task Force on Victims of Crime (1982)
- Presidential Task Force on Market Mechanisms (1987–1988)

=== Bill Clinton ===
- Climate Change Task Force (1997–2000)
- President's Task Force on Puerto Rico's Status (2000–2011)

=== George W. Bush ===
- Energy Task Force (2001)
- Corporate Fraud Task Force (2002–2009)
- Task Force on New Americans (2006–)

=== Barack Obama ===
- Middle Class Working Families Task Force (2009–2010)
- Presidential Task Force on the Auto Industry (2009)
- Task Force on Childhood Obesity (2010–2017)
- Task Force on Space Industry WorkForce and Economic Development (2010)
- President's Task Force on 21st Century Policing (2014–2015)
- White House Task Force to Protect Students from Sexual Assault (2014–2017)

=== Donald Trump ===
- Presidential Task Force on Missing and Murdered American Indians and Alaska Natives (2020)
- White House Coronavirus Task Force (2020–2021)
  - COVID-19 Supply Chain Task Force/Supply Chain Stabilization Task Force (2020–2021)
- White House Economic Task Force/Great American Economic Revival Industry Groups (2020–2021)
- White House Task Force on Celebrating America’s 250th Birthday ("Task Force 250") (2025–)
- FIFA World Cup 2026 Task Force (2025–)

=== Joe Biden ===
- White House COVID-19 Response Team (2021–2023)
  - COVID-19 Health Equity Task Force (2021–)
  - White House Supply Chain Disruptions Task Force (2021–)
- National Climate Task Force (2021–)
- Interagency Task Force on the Reunification of Families (2021–)
- White House Task Force on Worker Organizing and Empowerment (2021–)
- Scientific Integrity Task Force (2021–)
- National Artificial Intelligence Research Resource Task Force (2021–)
- Buy Clean Task Force (2022–)
- Interagency Task Force on Reproductive Healthcare Access (2022–)
- White House Task Force to Address Online Harassment and Abuse (2022–)

== See also ==
- Presidential commission (United States)
- COVID-19 Advisory Board
