= Honeywell, Inc. v. Sperry Rand Corp. =

U.S. federal case on computer patents

- Court: United States District Court for the District of Minnesota
- Full case name: Honeywell Inc. v. Sperry Rand Corporation et al.
- Decided: October 19, 1973
- Citation: 180 U.S.P.Q. 673

Court membership
- Judge sitting: Earl R. Larson

Keywords
- Patent misuse, ENIAC

Honeywell, Inc. v. Sperry Rand Corp., et al., 180 U.S.P.Q. 673 (D. Minn. 1973) (Case 4-67 Civil 138, 180 USPO 670), was a landmark U.S. federal court case that in October 1973 invalidated the 1964 patent for the ENIAC, the world's first general-purpose electronic digital computer. The decision held, in part, the following: 1. that the ENIAC inventors had derived the subject matter of the electronic digital computer from the Atanasoff–Berry computer (ABC), prototyped in 1939 by John Atanasoff and Clifford Berry, 2. that Atanasoff should have legal recognition as the inventor of the first electronic digital computer and 3. that the invention of the electronic digital computer ought to be placed in the public domain.

== Dispute origins ==
The case was a combination of two separate lawsuits: one brought by Sperry Rand Corporation and its holding company Illinois Scientific Developments against Honeywell Corporation in Washington, D.C., charging Honeywell with patent infringement and demanding royalties, and a countersuit filed in Minneapolis, Minnesota by Honeywell charging Sperry Rand with monopoly and fraud and seeking the invalidation of the ENIAC patent, alleged to be infirm. Both suits were filed on May 26, 1967, with Honeywell filing just minutes earlier, a fact that would later have tremendous bearing on the case.

The trial was presided over by U.S. District Court Judge Earl R. Larson between June 1, 1971, and March 13, 1972, in Minneapolis, Minnesota, a jurisdiction decided when D.C. Circuit Chief Judge John Sirica ruled that Honeywell had won the May 26 race to file the suit in court. Attorneys for Sperry Rand wanted the case to be tried in Washington, D.C., a district perceived to be friendlier to the rights of patent holders; by contrast, Honeywell was at the time the largest private employer in Minnesota. The plaintiff's final 500-page brief in the case was filed September 30, 1972.

Chief among the disputes Honeywell v. Sperry Rand was to resolve were:

- The legality of a 1956 patent-sharing agreement between Sperry Rand and IBM (itself born out of patent litigation), which was contended to represent an illegal collusion in violation of antitrust laws.
- The enforceability and validity of the patent for the ENIAC filed by its inventors J. Presper Eckert and John W. Mauchly, a patent which by that time had come to be held by Sperry Rand Corporation through a series of corporate acquisitions and mergers. The patent on the ENIAC, U.S. patent 3,120,606, application date June 26, 1947, issue date February 4, 1964, had been placed with a Sperry Rand subsidiary, Illinois Scientific Developments, newly created for the express purpose of marketing licenses for the newly issued patent. Because it was ostensibly the patent on the premiere electronic digital computer, Sperry Rand held that this patent entitled them to collect royalties on the sales of all electronic digital computers in what was by the late 1960s a rapidly expanding data processing industry, including Honeywell, Control Data, Burroughs, RCA, National Cash Register, General Electric, and Philco-Ford, and peripheral equipment manufacturers. (Illinois Scientific Developments demanded royalties of $250 million from Honeywell initially, a figure that was lowered to $20 million prior to the start of litigation, and $150 million altogether from the other listed firms.)
- The enforceability (but not the validity) of what was known as the 30A package of patents filed by Eckert and Mauchly and held by Sperry Rand, which included patents for a delay-line memory system (U.S. patent 2,629,827, applied for October 31, 1947, and issued in 1953) and a number of serial binary adders.
- Royalties (and damages, legal fees, court costs, etc.) owed Sperry Rand by Honeywell should their patents be found valid and enforceable.

With 135 days of oral courtroom testimony by 77 witnesses—and the presentation of the deposition of an additional 80 witnesses—for a total trial transcript of 20,667 pages, Honeywell v. Sperry Rand was at that time the longest trial in the history of the federal court system. It was preceded by six years of litigation that produced thousands of pages of under-oath depositions. The court marked 25,686 exhibits for the plaintiff Honeywell; defendants Sperry Rand and its subsidiary Illinois Scientific Developments contributed 6,968 exhibits. The corporations on the two sides spent a combined more than $8 million pursuing the case. The resulting exhibits and testimony constitute a massive evidentiary record describing the invention and development of the electronic digital computer. Materials relevant to the case but not entered into evidence have appeared, but sparsely and infrequently, since the case's conclusion in 1973.

Computers played a major role in the prosecution of the case for plaintiff Honeywell. A computerized record of documents pertaining to the case, known as Electronic Legal Files (or ELF), allowed Honeywell attorneys to store, sort, recall, and print information on hundreds of different subjects.

== Decision ==
More than seven months following the end of courtroom testimony, Judge Earl R. Larson's decision was published on October 19, 1973, in a document, over 248 pages long, titled Findings of Fact, Conclusions of Law, and Order for Judgment. Its conclusions defy summarization, but key findings include:

- John W. Mauchly and J. Presper Eckert were the co-inventors of the ENIAC; other contributors to the computer's design, Arthur W. Burks, T. K. Sharpless, and Robert F. Shaw, who had petitioned to have their names added to the patent as inventors after it had already been issued, did not qualify for co-inventor status, nor did other contributors John H. Davis, Frank Mural, and Chuan Chu.
- Honeywell had infringed on the ENIAC patent (Finding 23). The judge awarded no monetary damages, as he invalidated the ENIAC patent on numerous grounds in the same decision (see below).
- Sperry Rand had tried to monopolize the electronic data processing industry in violation of the Sherman Antitrust Act, on the basis of a cross-licensing agreement between Sperry Rand and IBM signed on August 21, 1956, but that only IBM had in fact succeeded in creating such a monopoly (Finding 15). The judge awarded no monetary damages despite these findings of conspiracy.
- The ENIAC patent was unenforceable (not invalid) on the grounds of unnecessary and unreasonable delay before the U.S. Patent Office (Finding 11). The judge ruled that undue delay in the patent's filing, which would have rendered the patent invalid, had not been proven.
- The ENIAC patent was unenforceable (not invalid) on the grounds of certain derelictions—including suppressing documents, withholding information, securing misleading affidavits, reversing legal positions in response to new evidence, blocking efforts of competitors to secure documents from the government, and proceeding with patent applications despite warnings of infirmities—on the U.S. Patent Office (Finding 13). The judge ruled that willful and intentional fraud on the U.S. Patent Office in filing the patent, which would have rendered the patent invalid, had not been proven. While the patent was rendered invalid on other grounds (see below), no finding of fraud on the Patent Office was significant, as the converse would have been a criminal offense and might have meant criminal prosecution for the patent filers.
- The ENIAC patent was invalid on the basis of the amount of time the inventors had permitted to elapse before filing the patent following its disclosure in public use (Finding 1). Dedication ceremonies for the ENIAC had taken place on February 15, 1946, which was prior to the critical date of June 26, 1946 (one year before the patent's filing), and any public disclosure of the device prior to the critical date rendered the patent invalid. (Problems run on the computer by figures outside the invention team took place even earlier.) The judge found the date of December 1, 1945, as the date the ENIAC was handed over to Army Ordnance and beyond which no further modifications could be considered experimental.
- The ENIAC patent was invalid on the basis of the amount of time the inventors had permitted to elapse before filing the patent following its placement on sale (Finding 2). The judge noted that the construction contract for the ENIAC placed the intended delivery date at December 31, 1945. Moreover, the first working parts of the ENIAC, consisting of two accumulators, had been shown to be operational in July 1944, and the judge ruled that these components of the eventual ENIAC were themselves an "automatic electronic digital computer", thus pushing the date before which Eckert and Mauchly would have needed to apply for the patent to July 1945.
- The ENIAC patent was invalid on the basis of the amount of time the inventors had permitted to elapse before filing the patent following the publication of its key features (Finding 7). The judge ruled that Herman Goldstine's June 30, 1945, dissemination of John von Neumann's First Draft of a Report on the EDVAC, a set of incomplete notes describing the logical design of the ENIAC's successor machine the EDVAC, which was being built simultaneously to the ENIAC's completion at the Moore School of Electrical Engineering at the University of Pennsylvania, constituted a publication under the law and an enabling disclosure of the ENIAC. Moreover, Eckert and Mauchly had published their own official report, Automatic High Speed Computing: A Progress Report on the EDVAC, on September 30, 1945, which was, again, prior to the critical date of June 26, 1946.
- Three of the 148 formal claims of the ENIAC patent were anticipated by a prior invention, the 1942 electronic multiplier by IBM's Byron E. Phelps (Finding 6), for which a patent was filed in late 1945. The judge ruled out derivation, as Mauchly and Eckert could not have been aware of this prior invention; nevertheless, its patent date preceded that of the ENIAC.
- 14 of the 148 formal claims of the ENIAC patent were invalid on the basis of an unreasonably delayed amendment to the patent application (Finding 10). In May 1963, attorneys for Sperry Rand tried to amend the ENIAC patent after discovering that the definition of the word "pulse", which carried over to 14 of the patent's claims (sometimes under the equivalent usage of "impulse" or "signal"), left a lower bound on the length of an electronic pulse of 2 microseconds. Thus, machines that operated at a speed of more than 1 MHz would not be covered by the ENIAC patent. The judge ruled that the patentholders' attempts to amend the patent at such a late date was "an exigent afterthought to capture the subsequent contributions of others already in the public domain".
- The 30A package of patents (the regenerative memory system and the serial binary adders) were unenforceable.
- The ENIAC patent was invalid on the basis of derivation (Finding 3).

The publication of the Honeywell v. Sperry Rand decision coincided with the event of the Saturday Night Massacre, one of many events in the ongoing Watergate scandal of Richard Nixon's presidency. As a result of the media's focus on Watergate, news of the decision did not attract public attention at the time.

== Derivation controversy ==
Finding 3 was the most controversial, as it ascribed the invention of the electronic digital computer to John V. Atanasoff:

3.1.2 Eckert and Mauchly did not themselves invent the automatic electronic computer, but instead derived that subject matter from one Dr. John Vincent Atanasoff.

— U.S. District Judge Earl R. Larson, Findings of Fact, Conclusions of Law, and Order for Judgement

Charges of derivation stemmed from testimony and correspondence describing meetings between Atanasoff and Mauchly in December 1940 and June 1941, the first at the University of Pennsylvania where Atanasoff attended a talk given by Mauchly at a meeting of the American Association for the Advancement of Science on use of Mauchly's harmonic analyzer (a simple analog computer) to speed the calculation of meteorological data to test for periodicities in precipitation, and the second in Ames, Iowa where Mauchly had driven to visit Atanasoff for a period of five days and to examine his progress on a special-purpose computing machine whose construction Atanasoff had described for Mauchly at the prior meeting. (In the discovery process leading up to Honeywell v. Sperry Rand, this device came to be called the Atanasoff–Berry Computer, or ABC; Clifford Berry had been Atanasoff's graduate student assistant in the computer development project in the basement of the physics building at Iowa State College and in 1942 the two of them left Iowa State for positions in war research—Atanasoff in Washington, D.C., and Berry in Pasadena, California.)

All parties agree that Mauchly had opportunity to see the ABC, which was then in a sufficiently advanced state of construction to demonstrate many if not all of its general principles. There is disagreement about (and no definitive evidence regarding) the extent to which Mauchly understood—or indeed was interested in or capable of understanding—the circuit designs incorporated in the machine. The ABC's inventors considered their invention novel and patentable. The same trip to Philadelphia in December 1940 included a visit to the Patent Office in Washington, D.C., to conduct patent searches—so Dr. Mauchly's contention under oath that the ABC's inventors were deliberately hesitant about revealing all of the machine's details would seem to be credible. All parties agreed that Mauchly took away with him no written technical description of the ABC. However, he was familiar enough with the ABC's basic method of operation, particularly the involvement of its rotating capacitor memory drum, to have described it to J. Presper Eckert in 1943 or 1944, and to have recounted it in some detail in a 1967 deposition, over 26 years after having visited the ABC in June 1941.

Correspondence from Mauchly to Atanasoff following Mauchly's visit was touted by the plaintiff as a smoking gun. Considered to be particularly damning to the Sperry Rand case were the following often-quoted excerpts:

A number of different ideas have come to me recently anent computing circuits—some of which are more or less hybrids, combining your methods with other things, and some of which are nothing like your machine. The question in my mind is this: is there any objection, from your point of view, to my building some sort of computer which incorporates some of the features of your machine? ... Ultimately a second question might come up, of course, and that is, in the event that your present design were to hold the field against all challengers, and I got the Moore School interested in having something of the sort, would the way be open for us to build an "Atanasoff Calculator" (a la Bush analyzer) here?

— John W. Mauchly to John V. Atanasoff, September 30, 1941

Taken in context, this and other letters entered into evidence in Honeywell v. Sperry Rand evinced a spirit of cordiality and mutual admiration between Mauchly and Atanasoff, one that would continue into the 1940s, as Atanasoff recommended Mauchly for part-time consulting work at the Naval Ordnance Laboratory in 1943 and Mauchly continued to visit Atanasoff in White Oak, Maryland throughout 1944, where Mauchly served as mentor, guide, and sounding board to some of those on Atanasoff's staff.

Honeywell v. Sperry Rand and the decision it culminated in emphasized the differences between the ENIAC and the ABC, some of which were:

- The ENIAC was electronic digital computing machines, while the ABC was a semi-electronic (i.e., only the computing was electronic, the control and synchronization was electromechanical using timing control drum), special-purpose (i.e., non-programmable) machine intended to solve systems of linear equations via a modified Gaussian elimination algorithm.
- The two machines were incomparable in size, scope of design, and cost.
- Both the ENIAC and ABC used triode vacuum tubes, but the ABC computed logically using binary adder circuits, whereas the ENIAC computed enumeratively using decimal ring counters. (For proponents of Mauchly's claims to have been influenced not by the ABC but by scaling circuits used to count cosmic rays at Swarthmore College, this is a significant distinction: if Mauchly derived any work from Atanasoff, why did he not appropriate for the ENIAC Atanasoff's add-subtract mechanism, in principle the most novel and enduring aspect of the ABC?)
- Most significantly to the legacies of the two devices, the ABC was never used in any practical way for the computational task for which it was constructed, owing in part to its need to write and read interim results to paper cards using an ill-conceived input-output system too error-prone for solving large systems of equations. The ENIAC, conversely, lived a useful service life spanning almost a decade, and was used for computational jobs in numerous scientific fields. Through its successor machine the EDVAC and the principles disseminated at the Moore School Lectures, the ENIAC influenced all future computing machines. The ABC was dismantled (with only a few of its basic components of its memory and arithmetic unit salvaged) without having been patented, published, or publicly demonstrated or described; thus it influenced no other computing machines, except insofar as such influence was transmitted through John Mauchly's exposure to the device (but again, derivation by Mauchly of any concept in the ABC is still a subject of controversy).

Following the ruling, some writers perceived recognition of Atanasoff for his title as "father of the computer" was slow in coming, and wrote books of their own. These included Pulitzer Prize-winning Iowan reporter Clark R. Mollenhoff and wife-and-husband team Alice Burks and Arthur Burks. (Arthur had been on the ENIAC's engineering staff and had requested to be added as a co-inventor following the issuance of the ENIAC patent; Alice Burks had been a computer at the Moore School.)

Since the ruling, the IEEE Annals of the History of Computing has been the principal battleground for articles debating the derivation controversy. Therein John Mauchly's widow Kay published her retort to the first Burks article following her husband's 1980 death. An article by Calvin Mooers, a former employee of Atanasoff's at the Naval Ordnance Laboratory, was published posthumously; in it, he questioned Atanasoff's commitment to and capacity for development of computing machines even when provided with ample financial resources.
