= Vera Glaser =

American journalist and feminist

- Born: 1916; St. Louis, Missouri
- Died: November 26, 2008 (aged 91–92); Chevy Chase, Maryland
- Occupation: Journalist

Vera Glaser (1916 – November 26, 2008) was a reporter, journalist, and is considered a pioneer for women's rights. She is best known for challenging President Richard Nixon at a press conference on the lack of women in his administration, which ultimately helped lead to the establishment of the White House Task Force on Women's Rights and Responsibilities.

== Early life and education ==
Glaser was born in St. Louis, Missouri in 1916. She became interested in journalism in high school, graduating first in her class. In her high school, the valedictorian was traditionally awarded a scholarship to Washington University, but a male student was selected instead. Glaser cites this experience of gender discrimination as turning her into a "fighting feminist".

== Career ==
In February 1969, Glaser was covering a televised press conference for newly elected President Richard Nixon as a representative of the North American Newspaper Alliance. Recognizing that she was one of the only women in the press room, she didn't want to pose an easy question, and asked the president: "Mr. President, since you’ve been inaugurated, you have made approximately 200 presidential appointments, and only three of them have gone to women. Can we expect some more equitable recognition of women’s abilities, or are we going to remain the lost sex?" Glaser recalls being greeted by "chuckles" throughout the room in response to her question. Nixon responded that he would look into the issue, leading to additional stories and questions on "women’s limited roles in the leadership of the federal government".

Glaser worked alongside feminist Catherine East to put continued questions to the Nixon administration on the status of women, including publishing a five-part series of articles on women in government. Congresswoman Florence Dwyer "ran with Glaser's ideas, urging Nixon to appoint more women". Glaser soon received a note from Nixon's chief domestic advisor, Arthur Burns, informing her of Nixon's intent to establish a task force on women and inviting her to join. On October 1, 1969, Nixon created the Task Force on Women's Rights and Responsibilities, with Glaser as a member. The task force is credited with tripling the number of appointed women to high-level government positions within one year.

Glaser also consulted for Pat Nixon, answering her request for a list of potential women lawyers and jurists who could be candidates for Richard Nixon's next Supreme Court justice nomination. Nixon eventually nominated Harry Blackmun.

In addition to working for the North American Newspaper Alliance newspaper syndicate, Glaser also worked with Knight Ridder throughout the 1960s and 1970s. She also worked with Malvina Stephenson for her investigative reports on Clark R. Mollenhoff, the special counsel to the Nixon White House noted for collecting the names of State Department employees critical of the president's policies during the Vietnam War. In the 1980s, Glaser worked for the Washingtonian magazine. In the 1990s, she was a correspondent for Maturity News Service. Glaser was one of the first female Washington bureau chiefs. She has also served as president of the Washington Press Club, governor of the National Press Club, and a board member of the International Women's Media Foundation.

== Death and legacy ==
Glaser died at the age of 92 on November 26, 2008, after battling Parkinson's disease.

Glaser is remembered for her contributions to advancing women's rights as well as her coverage of the women's liberation movement, tracing her efforts back "to one famous question [she] posed to President Nixon".
