= Malvina Stephenson =

Slovene activist and publisher

- Born: October 17, 1911; Paris, Texas
- Died: February 16, 1996 (aged 84)
- Occupation: Journalist

Malvina Stephenson (1911–1996) was an American journalist noted for her coverage of Washington, D.C. politics. She is considered to be one of the pioneering women reporters to break on the national scene. Stephenson also served as the press secretary and the biographer of Senator Robert Samuel Kerr.

== Biography ==
Stephenson was born on October 17, 1911, in Paris, Texas. Her family relocated to Hugo, Oklahoma where her father, Robert E. Stephenson, practiced law.

Stephenson graduated from Sapulpa High School. She took an associate degree in history at the Southeastern State Teachers College (now Southeastern Oklahoma State University). After graduating in 1932, she taught for three years. She then obtained a master's degree in journalism at the University of Oklahoma before working as a feature writer for the Tulsa World. She then relocated to Washington, D.C. and started covering Washington politics. In an interview, Stephenson said that she went to Washington with $700 savings.

Stephenson founded her own independent news bureau and became a regular correspondent for several newspapers such as the Tulsa World, Tulsa Tribune, Cincinnati Times-Star, The Kansas City Star, ABC Radio, and United Feature, among others. In 1944, she became part of the weekly radio program with Ray Henle.

By 1951 Stephenson was selected as Senator Kerr's press secretary, a job she kept until 1963. She was a co-author of his book Land, Wood, and Water. After Kerr died in 1963, Stephenson resumed her work as a journalist and became part of the female political columnist team that produced Washington Offbeat. She regularly contributed an op-ed column for the Tulsa World. Some of her noted works were written with Vera Glaser and these included reports about Clark Mollenhoff, a special counsel to Nixon's White House, and his collection of the 250 names of State Department employees who criticized Nixon's policies during the Vietnam War.

In 1995 Stephenson published Kerr's biography. She died a year later, on February 16, 1996.
