= Evelyn Cunningham =

- Born: January 25, 1916; Elizabeth City, North Carolina, United States
- Died: April 28, 2010 (aged 94); Manhattan, New York, United States
- Other names: "Big East"; "The Lynching Editor"
- Occupation: Journalist
- Known for: Civil rights reporting

Evelyn Cunningham (January 25, 1916 – April 28, 2010) was an American journalist and aide to Nelson Rockefeller. Cunningham covered the early civil rights movement and was a reporter and editor for the Pittsburgh Courier. In 1998, Cunningham was one of five former Courier reporters who accepted a George Polk Career Award for the paper's civil rights coverage, the first time the award had gone to a newspaper rather than an individual.

== Early life ==
Evelyn Cunningham was born Evelyn Elizabeth Long in Elizabeth City, North Carolina, one of two children of a taxicab driver and a dressmaker. The family moved to New York City when Evelyn was a child; she was educated in city schools and graduated from Hunter College High School in 1934 and from Long Island University in 1943, earning a bachelor's degree.

== Career ==
The Pittsburgh Courier was a Black newsweekly with a national readership. Cunningham joined the Courier in 1940 and mostly worked from the paper's New York office on 125th Street until 1962. She earned the nickname the "lynching editor" due to her extensive coverage of lynchings in the deep south. While at the Courier, she asked Birmingham police commissioner Bull Connor for an interview; he walked away. Cunningham later recalled that before leaving he referred to the Courier with a racial slur.

She covered major civil rights stories, including school desegregation in Birmingham, the Montgomery bus boycott, the killings of Black sharecroppers who had voted, and the work of Martin Luther King Jr. and Malcolm X. The Daily News described her as one of the first reporters to identify King as a rising leader in the movement. She also wrote a column, "The Women." Cunningham wrote a three-part series on the King family from those meetings. She often worked with Thurgood Marshall, covering the cases he defended. One evening, police raided an after-hours club in Harlem where they were. According to historian Gilbert King, Cunningham "accosted a cop she knew, telling him, 'You can't arrest this man. He is very, very important, he's with the NAACP, you've got to let him go.'"

In the 1960s, Cunningham hosted a radio show, At Home With Evelyn Cunningham, on WLIB in New York. In the late 1960s, she became a special assistant to Governor Nelson Rockefeller, who put her in charge of an office on women's affairs. She continued to advise him during his vice presidency. She also served on Nixon's Task Force on Women's Rights and Responsibilities.

In 1970, Cunningham was one of the founders of the New York Coalition of One Hundred Black Women, a non-profit organization dedicated to bettering the lives of black women "and their families through implementing initiatives and services to address important social, political, economical [and] cultural issues."

In 2002, Mayor Michael Bloomberg appointed Cunningham to a commission on women's issues.

== Personal life ==
In the newsroom, Cunningham was nicknamed "Big East," partly because of her height, nearly six feet in heels. She married four times. In a 1998 interview, she said, "Each one of my husbands tried to diminish my independence and my work." Her fourth marriage was to Austin H. Brown, a Juilliard-trained pianist and watchmaker who died in 2009.

She had one brother, who died in 1973; she raised his daughter. She also had two step-daughters from Austin's previous marriage, which also gave her two grandchildren.
