= Virginia Allan =

American educator and activist (1916–1999)

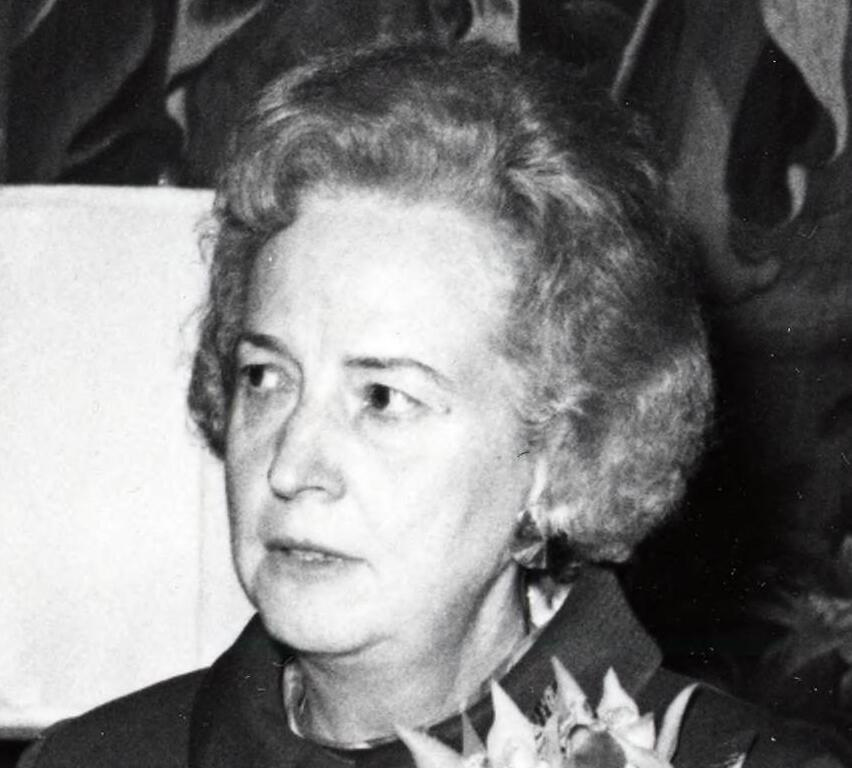
- Allan in 1972
- Born: October 21, 1916; Wyandotte, Michigan
- Died: August 8, 1999 (aged 82); Sarasota, Florida
- Occupations: Educator; business person; civil servant

Virginia Allan (1916–1999) was an American educator and women's employment advocate.

== Biography ==
Allan was born in Wyandotte, Michigan on October 21, 1916. She received both an AB and MA from the University of Michigan, graduating Phi Beta Kappa. After completing her education and working on a World War II assembly line, Allan began her career as an educator teaching English in the Dearborn and Detroit school systems. She served as President of the National Federation of Business and Professional Women from 1963-1964, during which time she began spreading the idea that state commissions on the status of women should be nationwide. She went on to serve as the Chair of President Nixon's Taskforce on Women's Rights and Responsibilities in 1969. In 1972, she was named the Deputy Assistant Secretary of State for Public Affairs. She was also the Director of the Graduate School of Women's Studies at George Washington University from 1977 to 1983. Upon her retirement in 1993, she moved to Sarasota, Florida, where she died on August 8, 1999.
