= Regenerative capacitor memory =

Regenerative capacitor memory is a type of computer memory that uses the electrical property of capacitance to store the bits of data. Because the stored charge slowly leaks away, these memories must be periodically regenerated (i.e. read and rewritten, also called refreshed) to prevent data loss.

Other types of computer memory exist that use the electrical property of capacitance to store the data, but do not require regeneration. Traditionally these have either been somewhat impractical (e.g., the Selectron tube) or are considered to be suitable only as read-only memory (e.g., EPROM, EEPROM/Flash memory (Note: Though not suited for use as a directly-accessible computer memory, Flash memory has developed into a widely used form of read-write mass storage with write speeds far exceeding competing technologies such as hard disks.)) since writing data takes significantly longer than reading.

== History ==
The first regenerative capacitor memory built was the rotating capacitor drum memory of the Atanasoff–Berry Computer (1942). Each of its two drums stored thirty 50-bit binary numbers (1500 bits each), rotated at 60 rpm and was regenerated every rotation (1 Hz refresh rate).

The first random access regenerative capacitor memory was the Williams tube (1947). As fitted to the first practical programmable digital computer, a single Williams tube held a total of 2560 bits, arranged in two 'pages'. One page was an array of thirty two 40-bit binary numbers, the capacity of a basic Williams-Kilburn Tube. The refresh rate required varied depending on the type of CRT used.

The modern DRAM (1966) is a regenerative capacitor memory.
