= Irving Copi =

American philosopher (1917–2002)

- Born: Copilovich or Copilowish; July 28, 1917; Duluth, Minnesota
- Died: August 19, 2002 (aged 85); Honolulu, Hawaii

Education
- Education: University of Chicago
- Academic advisor: Bertrand Russell

Philosophical work
- Era: Contemporary philosophy
- Region: Western philosophy
- School: Analytic philosophy
- Institutions: University of Illinois; University of Michigan
- Main interests: Calculus of relations
- Notable works: Introduction to Logic (1953)
- Notable ideas: Logical matrix Venn diagram method for syllogism testing Reverse truth table method for syllogism testing

Irving Marmer Copi (/ˈkɒpi/; né Copilovich or Copilowish; July 28, 1917 – August 19, 2002) was an American philosopher, logician, and university textbook author.

== Biography ==
Copi studied under Bertrand Russell while at the University of Chicago. In 1948 he contributed to the calculus of relations with his article using logical matrices.

Copi taught at the University of Illinois, the United States Air Force Academy, Princeton University, and the Georgetown University Logic Institute, before teaching logic at the University of Michigan, 1958–69, and at the University of Hawaii at Manoa, 1969–90.

Assigned to teach logic, Copi reviewed the available textbooks and decided to write his own. His manuscript was split into his Introduction to Logic (1953), and Symbolic Logic (1954). A reviewer noted that it had an "unusually comprehensive chapter on definition" and mentions that "the author accounts for the seductive nature of informal fallacies". The textbooks, now published by Routledge proved popular, and a reviewer of the third edition noted over 100 new exercises added. Both textbooks have been widely used. The most recent edition of Introduction to Logic was published in 2019. Copi is still listed as the primary author and updates are credited to Carl Cohen of the University of Michigan and Victor Rodych of the University of Lethbridge (Alberta, Canada).

=== Family ===
In 1941 Copi married Amelia Glaser. They had four children David, Thomas, William, and Margaret.

== Books ==
- 1953: Introduction to Logic. Macmillan.
- 1954: Symbolic Logic. Macmillan.
- 1965: (edited with Paul Hente). Language, Thought and Culture. The University of Michigan Press.
- 1966: (edited with Robert W. Beard). Essays on Wittgenstein's Tractatus. Macmillan.
- 1967: (edited with James Gould). Contemporary Readings in Logical Theory. Macmillan.
- 1971: The Theory of Logical Types. Routledge and Kegan Paul.
- 1986: (with Keith Burgess-Jackson). Informal Logic. Macmillan.

== Articles ==
- 1948: "Matrix development of the calculus of relations", Journal of Symbolic Logic 13(4): 193–203 Jstor link
- 1953: "Analytical Philosophy and Analytical Propositions", Philosophical Studies 4(6): 87–93.
- 1954: "Essence and Accident", Journal of Philosophy 51(23): 706–19.
- 1956: "Another variant of Natural Deduction", Journal of Symbolic Logic 21(1): 52–5.
- 1956: (with Arthur W. Burks) "The Logical Design of an Idealized General-Purpose Computer", Journal of the Franklin Institute 261: 299–314, and 421–36.
- 1957: "Tractatus 5.542", Analysis 18(5): 102–4.
- 1958: (with Calvin C. Elgot and Jesse B. Wright). "Realization of Events with Logical Nets" Journal of the Association for Computing Machinery 5(2) April 1958; reprinted in Elgot, Calvin C. (1982). Selected Papers. Springer-Verlag New York Inc.
- 1958: "The Burali-Forti Paradox", Philosophy of Science 25(4): 281–6.
- 1963: (with Eric Stenius) "Wittgenstein’s Tractatus: A Critical Exposition of its Main Lines of Thought", Philosophical Review 72(3): 382.
