= Serial binary adder =

The serial binary adder or bit-serial adder is a synchronous digital circuit that performs binary addition bit by bit. The serial full adder has three single-bit inputs for the numbers to be added and the carry in. There are two single-bit outputs for the sum and carry out. The carry-in signal is the previously calculated carry-out signal. The addition is performed by adding each bit, lowest to highest, one per clock cycle.

== Serial binary addition ==
Serial binary addition is done by a flip-flop and a full adder. The flip-flop takes the carry-out signal on each clock cycle and provides its value as the carry-in signal on the next clock cycle. After all of the bits of the input operands have arrived, all of the bits of the sum have come out of the sum output.

== Serial binary subtractor ==
The serial binary subtractor operates the same as the serial binary adder, except the subtracted number is converted to its two's complement before being added. Alternatively, the number to be subtracted is converted to its ones' complement, by inverting its bits, and the carry flip-flop is initialized to a 1 instead of to 0 as in addition. The ones' complement plus the 1 is the two's complement.

== Example of operation ==
Decimal
5+9=14
- X=5, Y=9, Sum=14
Binary
0101+1001=1110

Addition of each step

Inputs			Outputs	
Cin	X	Y	Sum	Cout
0	1	1	0	1
1	0	0	1	0
0	1	0	1	0
0	0	1	1	0

*addition starts from LSb

Result=1110 or 14

== See also ==
- Parallel binary adder
