= White House Task Force to Address Online Harassment and Abuse =

Agency overview
- Formed: 2022
- Jurisdiction: Government of the United States

The White House Task Force to Address Online Harassment and Abuse is a United States task force whose stated function is to address and prevent online harassment and abuse. It will particularly focus on online harassment and abuse against LGBT people and women, who are disproportionately affected. The task force was launched on June 16, 2022, in an announcement made by Vice President Kamala Harris.

== Reception ==
Conservatives and libertarians have criticized the task force, including former New York congresswoman Nan Hayworth, Media Research Center founder and CEO Brent Bozell, Conservative commentator Matt Whitlock, and the libertarian organization Young Americans for Liberty. Some of them have accused the task force of being similar to the recently paused Disinformation Governance Board (DGB). Conservatives have also accused the task force of being designed to censor conservative speech.
