= Clark R. Mollenhoff =

American journalist, author, and Presidential Counsel (1921–1991)

Clark R. Mollenhoff (April 16, 1921 – March 2, 1991) was a Pulitzer Prize winning American journalist, an attorney who served as Presidential Special Counsel, and a columnist for The Des Moines Register.

== Life and career ==
Born in Burnside, Iowa on April 16, 1921, to Margaret and Raymond E. Mollenhoff, Clark R. Mollenhoff graduated from high school in Webster City, Iowa. He began working for The Des Moines Register in 1942 while attending Drake University law school, from which he graduated in 1944. Mollenhoff then served two years in the U.S. Navy before returning to the Register.

In 1955 he was given the Raymond Clapper Memorial Award for his Washington reporting. In 1958 Mollenhoff won the Pulitzer Prize for National Reporting, for a series exposing racketeering and fraud in the Teamsters Union. His work led to a successful crack-down on corruption within the Teamsters.

In 1959 he received the Elijah Parish Lovejoy Award as well as an honorary Doctor of Laws degree from Colby College.

Eisenhower Fellowships selected Mollenhoff as a USA Eisenhower Fellow in 1960.

In 1965, Mollenhoff published Despoilers of Democracy, which provided details of corruption associated with Senate Majority Leader Lyndon B. Johnson (before he became president), in particular the Billie Sol Estes swindles and the TFX scandal of 1963, investigation into which was suspended after the assassination of John F. Kennedy.

In 1965 he published Tentacles of Power: The Story of Jimmy Hoffa. The 1983 television film Blood Feud is partially based on the book. Mollenhoff is portrayed by Douglas Dirkson in the film. In 1969 he served for a year as Special Counsel to President Richard Nixon, after which he became the Register's Washington bureau chief.

In 1976 Mollenhoff became a professor at Washington and Lee University in Lexington, Virginia while continuing to write a column for the Register.

In 1988 he wrote a biography of John Vincent Atanasoff, the Iowa State College professor who invented the first electronic digital computer in 1939. Mollenhoff's book gives the Atanasoff perspective of the 1973 federal court decision of Honeywell v. Sperry Rand that ruled the ENIAC computer patent invalid, and drew attention to Atanasoff's work.

Mollenhoff wrote twelve books and won many additional awards.

While living in Lexington, Virginia, Clark R. Mollenhoff died of cancer on March 2, 1991, at the age of 69.

The Clark Mollenhoff Award for Excellence in Investigative Reporting is awarded annually by the Institute on Political Journalism for the best investigative journalism article in a newspaper or magazine.

== Books ==
- Washington Cover-Up: How Bureaucratic Secrecy Promotes Corruption and Waste in the Federal Government (1962), Doubleday. ISBN 0548443475 (2007 edition)
- Tentacles of Power: The Story of Jimmy Hoffa (1965), World Publishing
- Despoilers of Democracy: The real story of what Washington propagandists, arrogant bureaucrats, mismanagers, influence peddlers, and outright corrupters are doing to our Federal Government (1965), Doubleday
- The Pentagon: Politics, Profits and Plunder (1967), G.P. Putnam's Sons
- George Romney: Mormon in Politics (1968), Meredith Press
- Strike Force: Organized Crime and the Government (1972), Prentice Hall, ISBN 0-13-852772-5
- The Man Who Pardoned Nixon (1976), The K.S. Giniger Company, Inc., ISBN 978-0-900997-89-1
- Game Plan for Disaster (1976), W.W. Norton & Co., ISBN 0-393-05543-4
- The President Who Failed: Carter out of Control (1980), Free Press, ISBN 0-02-921750-4
- Investigative Reporting: From Courthouse to White House (1981), Macmillan, ISBN 0-02-381870-0
- Atanasoff: Forgotten Father of the Computer. Ames, IOWA: Iowa State University Press. 1988. ISBN 0-8138-0032-3.
- Ballad to an Iowa Farmer: and Other Reflections (1991), Iowa State University Press ISBN 0-8138-1458-8
