= Clifford Berry =

American computer scientist (1918–1963)

- Born: April 19, 1918; Gladbrook, Iowa, US
- Died: October 30, 1963 (aged 45); New York City, US
- Education: Iowa State College
- Known for: Atanasoff–Berry computer
- Scientific career
- Fields: Electrical engineering
- Doctoral advisor: John Vincent Atanasoff

Clifford Edward Berry (April 19, 1918 – October 30, 1963) was an American computer scientist who helped John Vincent Atanasoff create the first digital electronic computer in 1939, the Atanasoff–Berry computer (ABC).

== Biography ==
Clifford Berry was born April 19, 1918, in Gladbrook, Iowa, to Fred and Grace Berry. His father owned an appliance repair shop, where he was able to learn about radios. He graduated from Marengo High School in Marengo, Iowa, in 1934 as the class valedictorian at age 16. He went on to study at Iowa State College (now known as Iowa State University), eventually earning a bachelor's degree in electrical engineering in 1939 and followed by his master's degree in physics in 1941.

In 1942, he married an ISU classmate and Atanasoff's secretary, Martha Jean Reed.

By 1948, he earned his PhD in physics from Iowa State University.

He died in 1963, attributed to "possible suicide".
