= John Vincent Atanasoff =

American computer pioneer (1903–1995)

John Vincent Atanasoff OCM
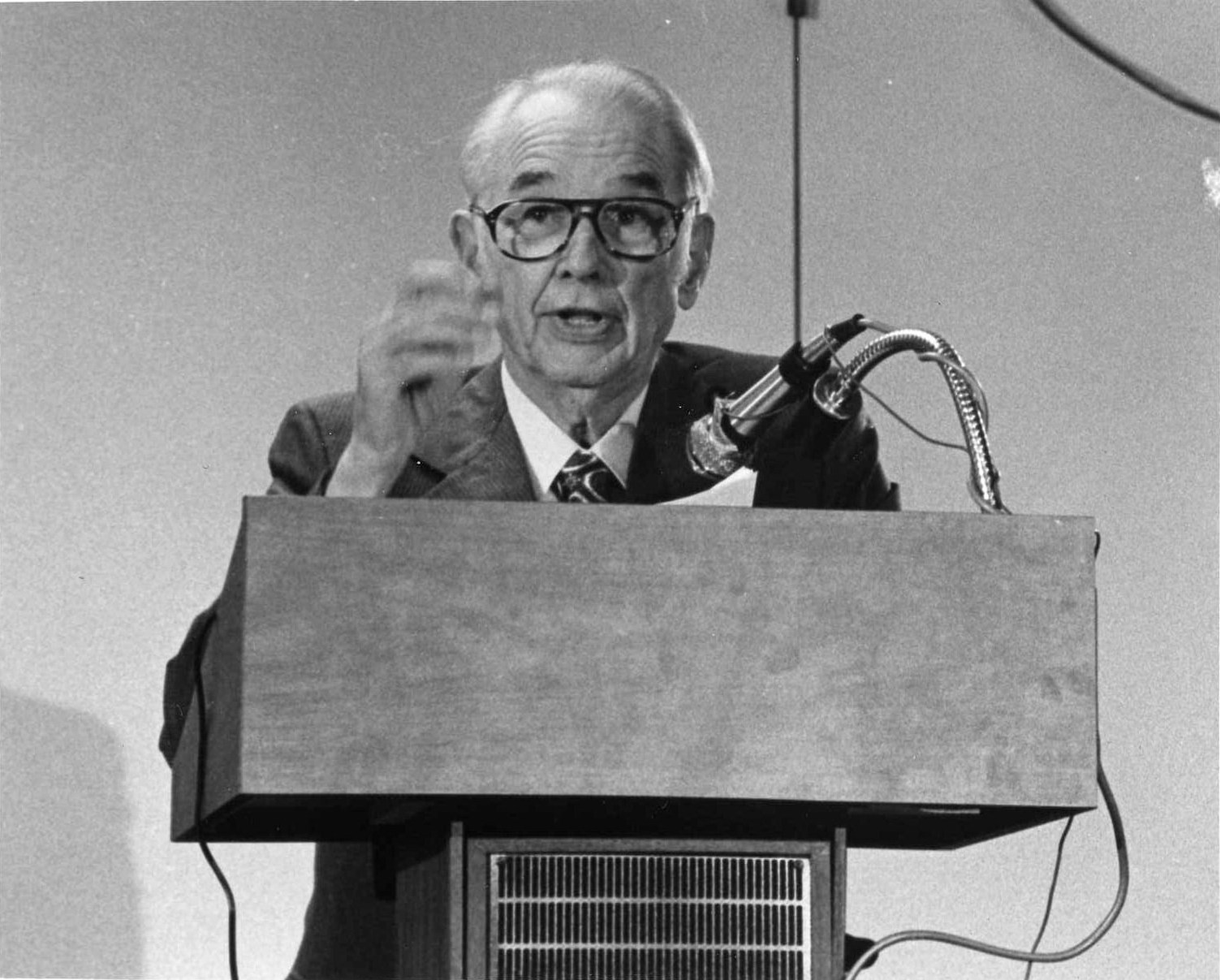
- Born: October 4, 1903; Hamilton, New York, U.S.
- Died: June 15, 1995 (aged 91); Frederick, Maryland, U.S.
- Education: University of Florida; Iowa State University; University of Wisconsin–Madison
- Known for: Atanasoff–Berry Computer
- Awards: Order of Saints Cyril and Methodius, First Class
- Scientific career
- Fields: Physics
- Doctoral advisor: J. H. V. Vleck

John Vincent Atanasoff (October 4, 1903 – June 15, 1995) was an American physicist and inventor credited with inventing the first electronic digital computer. Atanasoff invented the first electronic digital computer in the 1930s at Iowa State College (now known as Iowa State University). Challenges to his claim were resolved in 1973 when the judge in Honeywell v. Sperry Rand case ruled that Atanasoff was the inventor of the computer. His special-purpose machine has come to be called the Atanasoff–Berry Computer.

== Early life and education ==
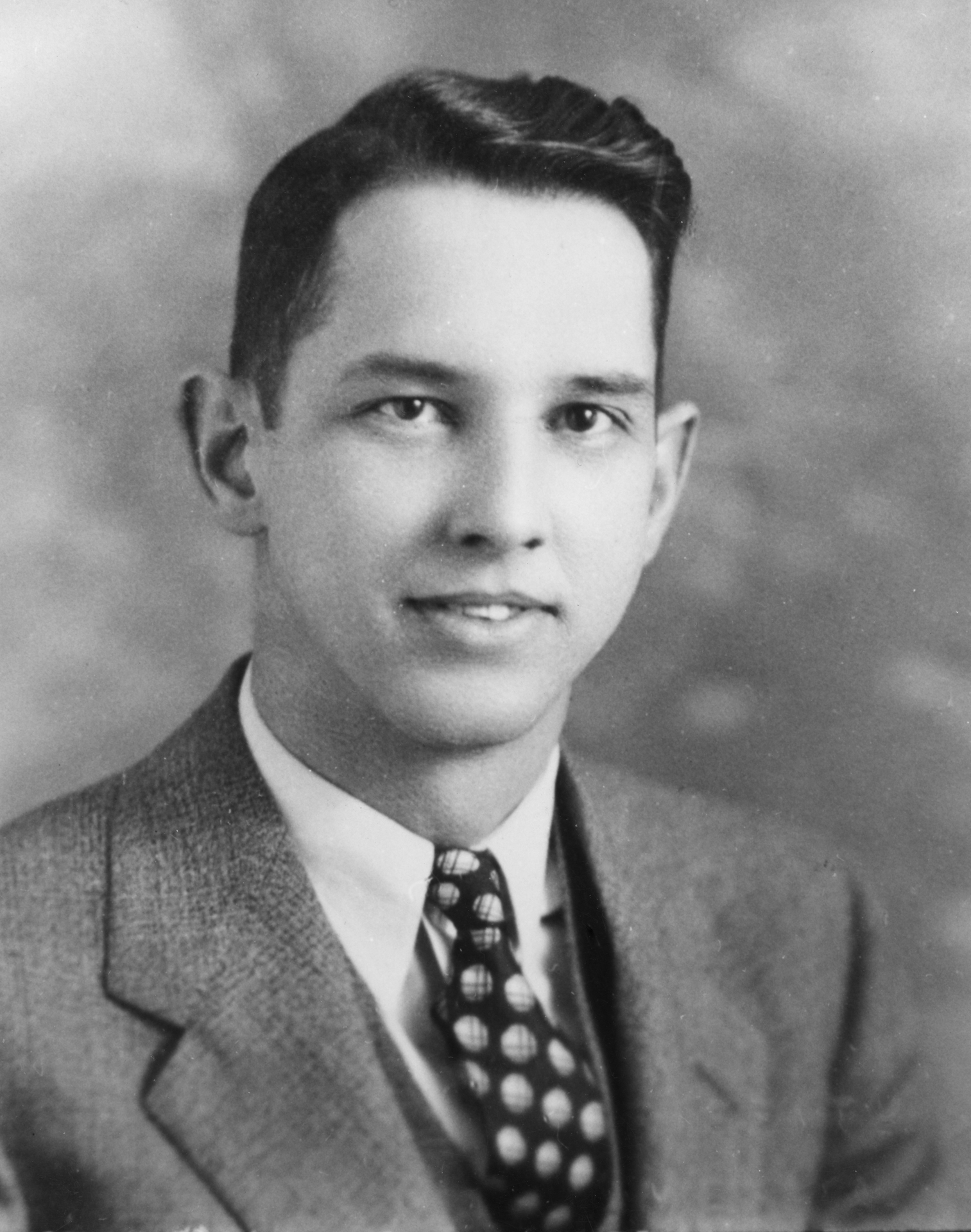
Atanasoff as a young man

Atanasoff was born on October 4, 1903, in Hamilton, New York to an electrical engineer and a school teacher. Atanasoff's father, Ivan Atanasov, was of Bulgarian origin, born in 1876 in the village of Boyadzhik, close to Yambol, then in the Ottoman Empire. While Ivan Atanasov was still an infant, his own father was killed by Ottoman soldiers after the Bulgarian April Uprising. In 1889, Ivan immigrated to the United States with his uncle. John's father later became an electrical engineer, whereas his mother, Iva Lucena Purdy (of mixed French and Irish ancestry), was a teacher of mathematics.

Atanasoff was raised in Brewster, Florida. Young Atanasoff's ambitions and intellectual pursuits were in part influenced by his parents, whose interests in the natural and applied sciences cultivated in him a sense of critical curiosity and confidence. At the age of nine, he learned to use a slide rule, followed shortly by the study of logarithms, and subsequently completed high school at Mulberry High School in two years. In 1925, Atanasoff received his Bachelor of Science degree in electrical engineering from the University of Florida.

He continued his education at Iowa State College and in 1926 earned a master's degree in mathematics. He completed his formal education in 1930 by earning a PhD in theoretical physics from the University of Wisconsin–Madison with his thesis, The Dielectric Constant of Helium. Upon completion of his doctorate, Atanasoff accepted an assistant professorship at Iowa State College in mathematics and physics.

== Computer development ==
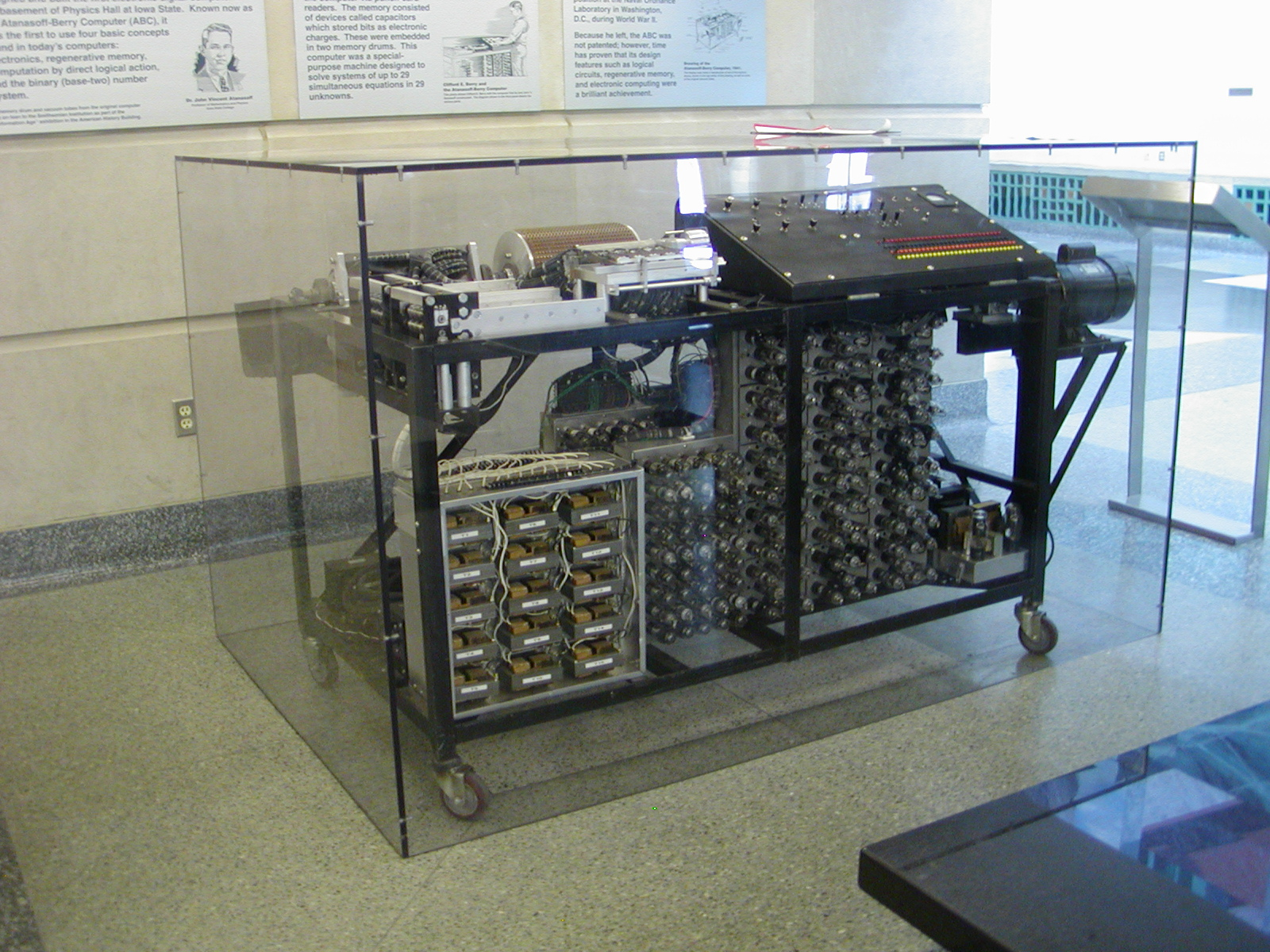
1997 replica of the Atanasoff–Berry Computer at Durham Center, Iowa State University

Partly due to the drudgery of using the mechanical Monroe calculator, which was the best tool available to him while he was writing his doctoral thesis, Atanasoff began to search for faster methods of computation. At Iowa State, Atanasoff researched the use of slaved Monroe calculators and IBM tabulators for scientific problems, with which controlled the Monroe using the output of an IBM. In 1936 he invented an analog calculator for analyzing surface geometry. At this point, he was pushing the boundaries of what gears could do and the fine mechanical tolerance required for good accuracy pushed him to consider digital solutions.

With a grant of $650 received in September 1939 and the assistance of his graduate student Clifford Berry, the Atanasoff–Berry Computer (ABC) was prototyped by November of that year. According to Atanasoff, several operative principles of the ABC were conceived by him during the winter of 1938 after a drive to Rock Island, Illinois.

The key ideas employed in the ABC included binary math and Boolean logic to solve up to 29 simultaneous linear equations. The ABC had no central processing unit (CPU), but was designed as an electronic device using vacuum tubes for digital computation. It also had regenerative capacitor memory that operated by a process similar to that used today in DRAM memory.

== Patent dispute ==
Atanasoff first met John Mauchly at the December 1940 meeting of the American Association for the Advancement of Science in Philadelphia, where Mauchly was demonstrating his "harmonic analyzer", an analog calculator for analysis of weather data. Atanasoff told Mauchly about his new digital device and invited him to see it.

In June 1941 Mauchly visited Atanasoff in Ames, Iowa for four days, staying as his houseguest. Atanasoff and Mauchly discussed the prototype ABC, examined it, and reviewed Atanasoff's design manuscript. In 1941 Atanasoff left Iowa State for a wartime assignment as Chief of the Acoustic Division with the Naval Ordnance Laboratory (NOL) in Washington, D.C. No patent application for the ABC was subsequently filed by Iowa State College.

Mauchly visited Atanasoff multiple times in Washington during 1943 and discussed computing theories, but did not mention that he was working on a computer project himself until early 1944.

By 1945 the U.S. Navy had decided to build a large-scale computer, on the advice of John von Neumann. Atanasoff was put in charge of the project, and he asked Mauchly to help with job descriptions for the necessary staff. However, Atanasoff was also given the responsibility of designing acoustic systems for monitoring atomic bomb tests. That job was made the priority, and he participated in the testing at Bikini Atoll in July 1946. By the time he returned from the testing the NOL computer project was shut down due to lack of progress, again on the advice of von Neumann.

In June 1954 IBM patent attorney A. J. Etienne sought Atanasoff's help in breaking an Eckert–Mauchly patent on a revolving magnetic memory drum, having been alerted by Clifford Berry that the ABC's revolving capacitor memory drum may have constituted prior art. Atanasoff agreed to assist the attorney, but IBM ultimately entered a patent-sharing agreement with Sperry Rand, the owners of the Eckert–Mauchly memory patent, and the case was dropped.

Atanasoff was deposed and testified at trial in the later action Honeywell v. Sperry Rand. In that case's decision, Judge Earl R. Larson found that "Eckert and Mauchly did not themselves first invent the automatic electronic digital computer, but instead derived that subject matter from one Dr. John Vincent Atanasoff".

Between 1954 and 1973, Atanasoff was a witness in the legal actions brought by various parties to invalidate electronic computing patents issued to Mauchly and J. Presper Eckert, which were owned by computer manufacturer Sperry Rand. In the 1973 decision of Honeywell v. Sperry Rand, a federal judge named Atanasoff the inventor of the electronic digital computer.

== Postwar life ==
Following World War II Atanasoff remained with the government and developed specialized seismographs and microbarographs for long-range explosive detection. In 1952 he founded and led the Ordnance Engineering Corporation, selling the company to Aerojet General Corporation in 1956 and becoming Aerojet's Atlantic Division president. He retired from Aerojet in 1961.

In 1960 Atanasoff and his wife Alice moved to their hilltop farm in New Market, Maryland for their retirement. In 1961 he started another company, Cybernetics Incorporated, in Frederick, Maryland which he operated for 20 years. He developed a phonetic alphabet for computers during this period of his life. He was gradually drawn into the legal disputes being contested by the fast-growing computer companies Honeywell and Sperry Rand. Following the resolution of Honeywell v. Sperry Rand, Atanasoff was warmly honored by Iowa State College, which had since become Iowa State University, and more awards followed.

Atanasoff died at the age of 91 on June 15, 1995, of a stroke at his home after a lengthy illness. He is buried in Pine Grove Cemetery in Mount Airy, Maryland.

== Heritage ==
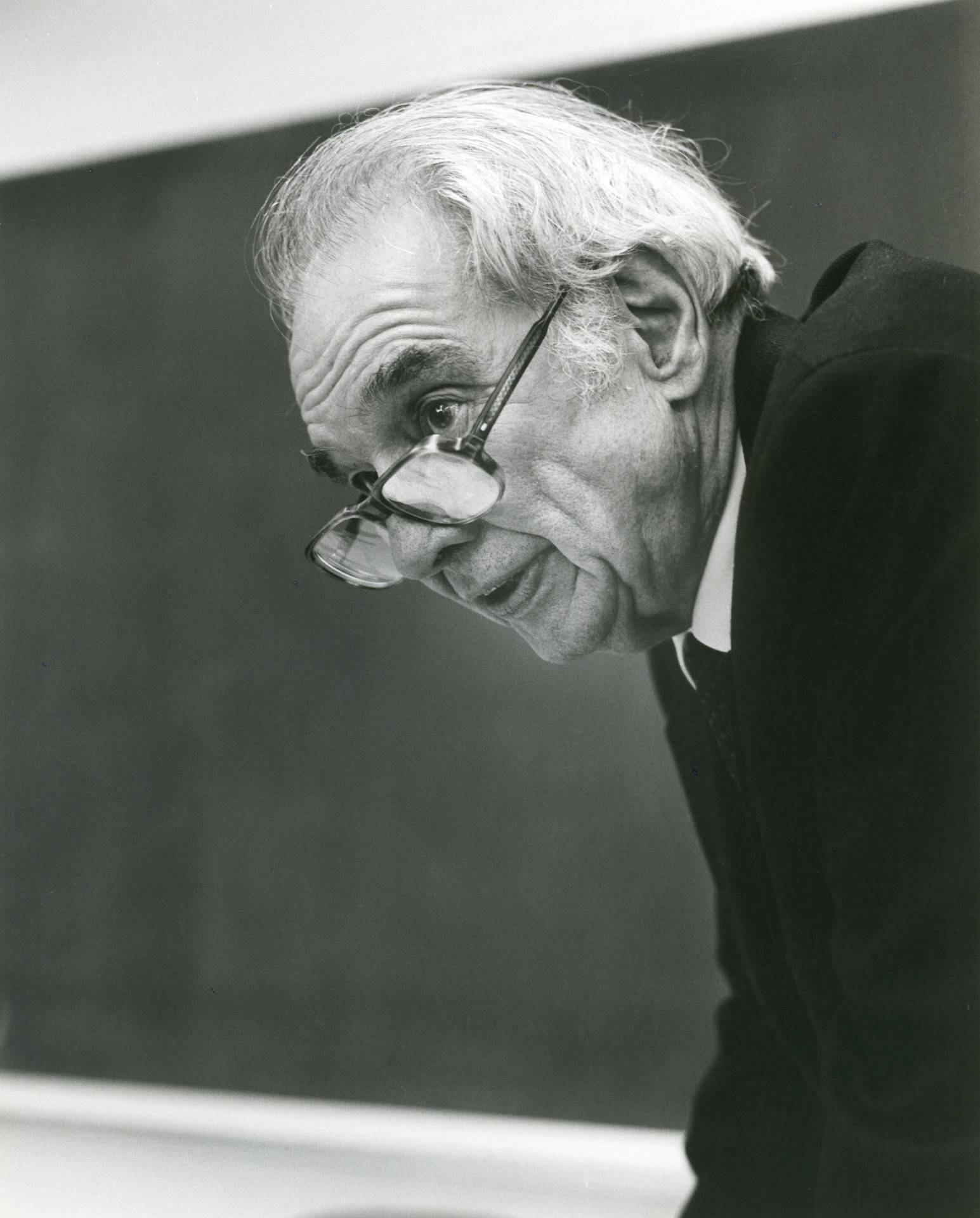
Atanasoff later in life

Atanasoff visited Bulgaria twice, in 1975 and 1985. He visited Boyadzhik village, where his grandfather had been shot by the Ottoman Turks, and was warmly welcomed by the locals and his father's relatives. He was made an honorable citizen of the town of Yambol, and received the "Key of the Town". He was also given various titles by the Bulgarian Academy of Sciences. The John Atanasov prize is awarded every year in Bulgaria. The 3546 Atanasoff asteroid found at the Bulgarian astronomic observatory of Rozhen, was named after him.

== Honors and distinctions ==
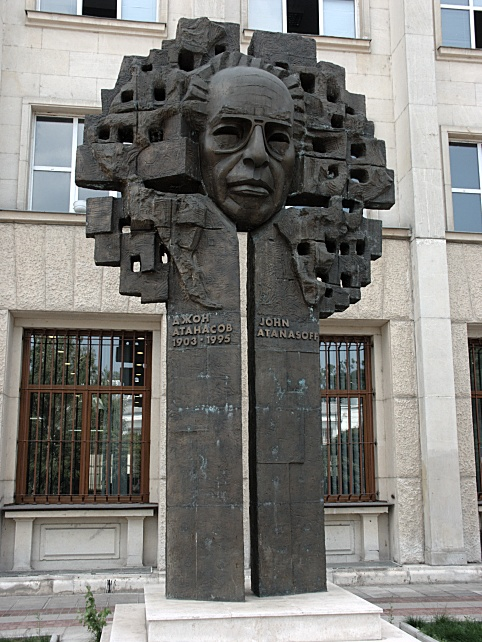
Monument to John Atanasoff in Sofia, Bulgaria

Atanasoff's first national award for scientific achievements was the Order of Saints Cyril and Methodius, First Class, Bulgaria's highest scientific honor bestowed to him in 1970, before the 1973 court ruling.

In 1990, President George H. W. Bush awarded Atanasoff the United States National Medal of Technology, the highest U.S. honor conferred for achievements related to technological progress.

Other distinctions awarded to Atanasoff include:

- Cosmos Club membership (1957)
- Computer Pioneer Medal from the Institute of Electrical and Electronics Engineers (IEEE) (1981)
- Order of the People's Republic of Bulgaria, First Class (1985)
- Computing Appreciation Award, EDUCOM (1985)
- Foreign Member of the Bulgarian Academy of Sciences (1985)
- Honorary citizen of the city of Yambol, Bulgaria (1985; Atanasoff's father was born in Yambol region)
- Iowa Award (2001)

=== Named after Atanasoff ===
- Atanasoff Hall, the home to Iowa State University's Computer Science department
- Atanasoff Nunatak (a peak) on Livingston Island in the South Shetland Islands, Antarctica
- The asteroid (3546) Atanasoff, discovered by the Rozhen Observatory
- The John Atanasoff Award, established by Georgi Parvanov in 2003 and bestowed annually by the President of Bulgaria to a young Bulgarian for achievements in the field of computer and information technologies and the information society of Bulgaria
- The John Atanasoff Technical College in the Bulgarian city of Plovdiv, a branch of the Technical University of Sofia
- The John Atanasoff Bulgarian national tournament in informatics and information technologies, held in the city of Shumen annually since 2001
- The John Atanasoff Professional High School of Electronics in the city of Stara Zagora, Bulgaria
- The John Atanasoff Professional High School of Electronics in Sofia
- The John Atanasoff Chitalishte (community cultural centre), Sofia
- The John Atanasoff Chitalishte, Boyadzhik Village, Bulgaria (the birthplace of Atanasoff's father)
- Prof. John Atanasoff 4th Primary School, Sofia
- The John Atanasoff Private High School, Blagoevgrad, Bulgaria
- The John Atanasoff Professional Technical High School, Kyustendil, Bulgaria
- The John Atanasoff Bulgarian Language School, Chicago, Illinois,
- The John Atanasoff Professional High School of Economic Informatics, Targovishte, Bulgaria
- The John Atanasoff University Student Computer Club, Plovdiv University, Bulgaria
- John Atanasoff Street, Yambol, Bulgaria
- John Atanasoff Street, Sofia

== Selected bibliography ==
- Atanasoff, John V. (July–September 1984). "Advent of the Electronic Digital Computing". IEEE Annals of the History of Computing. 6 (3): 229–282. doi:10.1109/MAHC.1984.10028. ISSN 1058-6180. S2CID 34553374.
- Atanasoff, John V. (1985), The Beginning, Sofia: Narodna Mladezh Publishers (Bulgarian version of his 1984 paper).

== See also ==
- List of pioneers in computer science
- Claude Shannon
- Victor Shestakov
- George Stibitz
- Konrad Zuse
