= White House Task Force on Women's Rights and Responsibilities =

Task Force on Women's Rights and Responsibilities
Agency overview
- Formed: October 1, 1969
- Jurisdiction: United States
- Headquarters: White House
- Agency executive: Virginia Allan, Chair

The Task Force on Women's Rights and Responsibilities was an American advisory committee appointed by President Richard Nixon on October 1, 1969.

The stated goal of the task force was to "review the present status of women in our society and recommend what might be done in the future to further advance their opportunities."

On December 15, 1969, the Task Force released A Matter of Simple Justice, a 77-page report.

== Recommendations ==
The Task Force made five recommendations in A Matter of Simple Justice, including:

- The establishment of an Office of Women's Rights and Responsibilities, reporting directly to the President.
- The convening of a women's rights conference by the White House to coincide with the 50th anniversary of the 19th Amendment to the U.S. Constitution.
- Presidential-led congressional action, including:
  - An equal rights amendment to the Constitution.
  - Amendments to the Civil Rights Acts of 1964 and 1957.
  - Amendments to the Fair Labor Standards Act and Social Security Act, as well as the Internal Revenue Code.
  - Federal support for child care and family assistance.
- Cabinet-level action to counteract gender discrimination.
- Presidential appointment of more women to federal government positions.

== Members ==
- Virginia Allan (Chair), Executive Vice President of Cahalan Drug Stores, Inc.
- Hon. Elizabeth Athanasakos, Municipal Court Judge and Attorney, Fort Lauderdale, FL
- Ann R. Blackham, President, Ann R. Blackham & Company, Winchester, MA
- P. Dee Boersma, Student Government Leader, graduate student, Ohio State University
- Evelyn Cunningham, Director, Women's Unit, Office of the Governor, New York, NY
- Sister Ann Ida Gannon, B.V.M., President, Mundelein College, Chicago, IL
- Vera Glaser, Correspondent, Knight Newspapers
- Dorothy Haener, International Representative, Women's Department, UAW, Detroit, MI
- Laddie F. Hutar, President, Public Affairs Services Associate, Inc., Chicago, IL
- Katherine B. Massenburg, Chairperson, Maryland Commission on the Status of Women, Baltimore, MD
- William C. Mercer, Vice President, Personnel Relations, American Telephone & Telegraph Company, New York, NY
- Dr. Alan Simpson, President, Vassar College, Poughkeepsie, NY
- Evelyn E. Whitlow, Attorney, Los Angeles, CA
