= Atanasoff–Berry computer =

Early electronic digital computing device

Atanasoff–Berry computer (ABC)
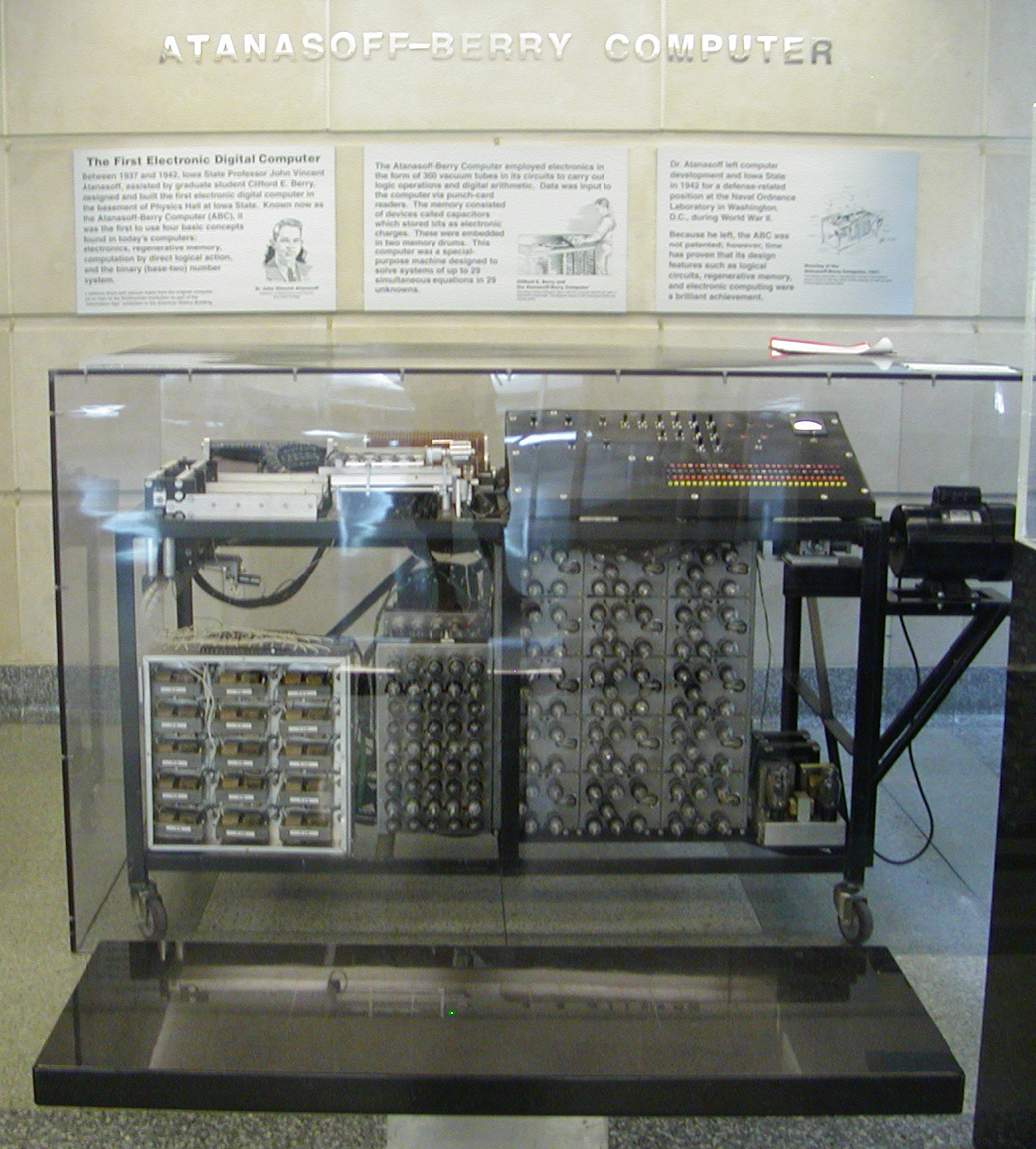
- Atanasoff–Berry computer replica at Durham Center, Iowa State University
- Developer: John Vincent Atanasoff with help of graduate student Clifford Berry
- Released: 1942; 84 years ago
- CPU: More than 300 vacuum tubes @ 60 Hz
- Memory: 3000 bits
- Display: Decimal, via a front panel display
- Input: Decimal, via standard IBM 80-column punched cards
- Weight: 700 pounds (320 kg)

The Atanasoff–Berry computer (ABC) was the first automatic electronic digital computer. The device was limited by the technology of the day. The ABC's priority is debated among historians of computer technology, because it was neither programmable, nor Turing-complete. Conventionally, the ABC would be considered the first electronic ALU (arithmetic logic unit) – which is integrated into every modern processor's design.

Its unique contribution was to make computing faster by being the first to use vacuum tubes to do arithmetic calculations. Prior to this, slower electro-mechanical methods were used by Konrad Zuse's Z1 computer, and the simultaneously developed Harvard Mark I. The first electronic, programmable, digital machine, the Colossus computer from 1943 to 1945, used similar tube-based technology as ABC.

== Overview ==
Conceived in 1937, the machine was built by Iowa State College mathematics and physics professor John Vincent Atanasoff with the help of graduate student Clifford Berry. It was designed only to solve systems of linear equations and was successfully tested in 1942. However, its intermediate result storage mechanism, a paper card writer/reader, was not perfected, and when John Vincent Atanasoff left Iowa State College for World War II assignments, work on the machine was discontinued. The ABC pioneered important elements of modern computing, including binary arithmetic and electronic switching elements, but its special-purpose nature and lack of a changeable, stored program distinguish it from modern computers. The computer was designated an IEEE Milestone in 1990.

Atanasoff and Berry's computer work was not widely known until it was rediscovered in the 1960s, amid patent disputes over the first instance of an electronic computer. At that time ENIAC, that had been created by John Mauchly and J. Presper Eckert, was considered to be the first computer in the modern sense, but in 1973 a U.S. District Court invalidated the ENIAC patent and concluded that the ENIAC inventors had derived the subject matter of the electronic digital computer from Atanasoff. When, in the mid-1970s, the secrecy surrounding the British World War II development of the Colossus computers that pre-dated ENIAC, was lifted and Colossus was described at a conference in Los Alamos, New Mexico, in June 1976, John Mauchly and Konrad Zuse were reported to have been astonished.

== Design and construction ==
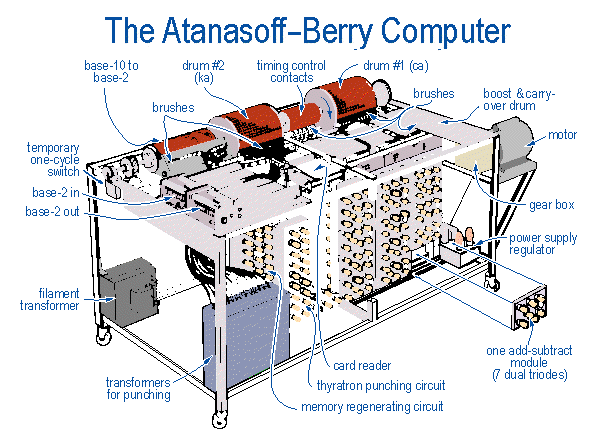
Diagram of the ABC pointing out its various components

According to Atanasoff's account, several key principles of the Atanasoff–Berry computer were conceived in a sudden insight after a long nighttime drive to Rock Island, Illinois, during the winter of 1937–38. The ABC innovations included electronic computation, binary arithmetic, parallel processing, regenerative capacitor memory, and a separation of memory and computing functions. The mechanical and logic design was worked out by Atanasoff over the next year. A grant application to build a proof of concept prototype was submitted in March 1939 to the Agronomy department, which was also interested in speeding up computation for economic and research analysis. $5,000 of further funding (equivalent to $116,000 in 2025) to complete the machine came from the nonprofit Research Corporation of New York City.

The ABC was built by Atanasoff and Berry in the basement of the physics building at Iowa State College from 1939 to 1942. The initial funds were released in September, and the 11-tube prototype was first demonstrated in October 1939. A December demonstration prompted a grant for construction of the full-scale machine. The ABC was built and tested over the next two years. A January 15, 1941, story in the Des Moines Register announced the ABC as "an electrical computing machine" with more than 300 vacuum tubes that would "compute complicated algebraic equations" (but gave no precise technical description of the computer). The system weighed more than seven hundred pounds (320 kg). It contained approximately 1-mile (1.6 km) of wire, 280 dual-triode vacuum tubes, 31 thyratrons, and was about the size of a desk.

It was not programmable, which distinguishes it from more general machines of the same era, such as Konrad Zuse's 1941 Z3 (or earlier iterations) and the Colossus computers of 1943–1945. Nor did it implement the stored-program architecture, first implemented in the Manchester Baby of 1948, required for fully general-purpose practical computing machines.

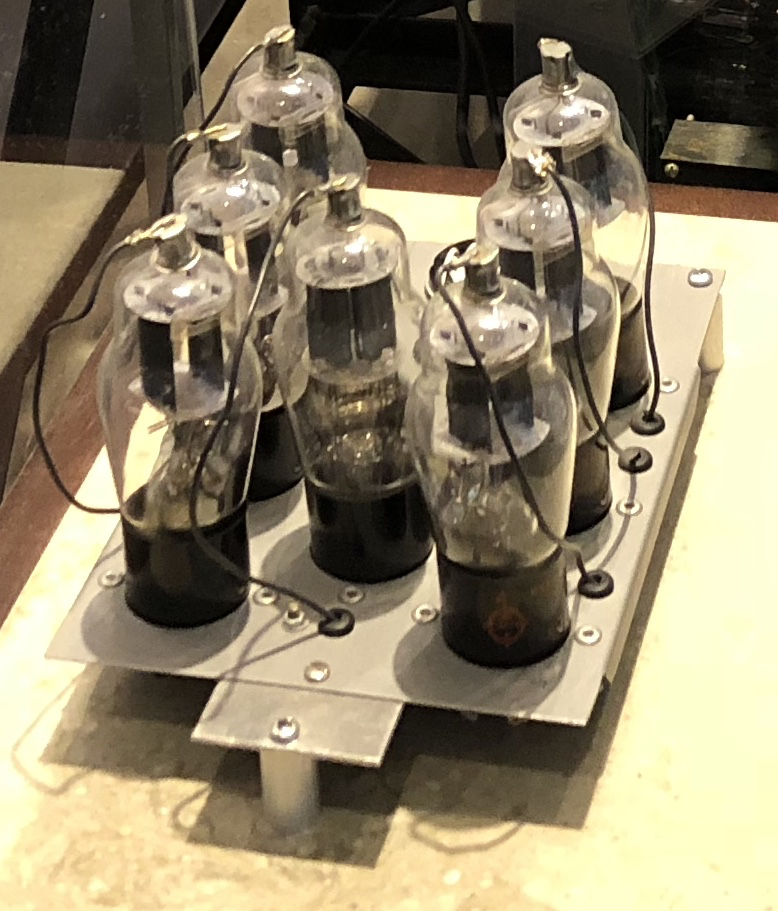
Add-subtract module (reconstructed) from Atanasoff–Berry computer

The machine was, however, the first to implement:

1. Using vacuum tubes, rather than wheels, ratchets, mechanical switches, or telephone relays, allowing for greater speed than previous computers
2. Using capacitors for memory, rather than mechanical components, allowing for greater speed and density

The memory of the Atanasoff–Berry computer was a system called regenerative capacitor memory, which consisted of a pair of drums, each containing 1600 capacitors that rotated on a common shaft once per second. The capacitors on each drum were organized into 32 "bands" of 50 (30 active bands and two spares in case a capacitor failed), giving the machine a speed of 30 additions/subtractions per second. Data was represented as 50-bit binary fixed-point numbers. The electronics of the memory and arithmetic units could store and operate on 60 such numbers at a time (3000 bits).

The alternating current power-line frequency of 60 Hz was the primary clock rate for the lowest-level operations.

The arithmetic logic functions were fully electronic, implemented with vacuum tubes. The family of logic gates ranged from inverters to two- and three-input gates. The input and output levels and operating voltages were compatible between the different gates. Each gate consisted of one inverting vacuum-tube amplifier, preceded by a resistor divider input network that defined the logical function. The control logic functions, which only needed to operate once per drum rotation and therefore did not require electronic speed, were electromechanical, implemented with relays.

The ALU operated on only one bit of each number at a time; it kept the carry/borrow bit in a capacitor for use in the next AC cycle.

Although the Atanasoff–Berry computer was an important step up from earlier calculating machines, it was not able to run entirely automatically through an entire problem. An operator was needed to operate the control switches to set up its functions, much like the electro-mechanical calculators and unit record equipment of the time. Selection of the operation to be performed, reading, writing, converting to or from binary to decimal, or reducing a set of equations was made by front-panel switches and, in some cases, jumpers.

There were two forms of input and output: primary user input and output and an intermediate results output and input. The intermediate results storage allowed operation on problems too large to be handled entirely within the electronic memory. (The largest problem that could be solved without the use of the intermediate output and input was two simultaneous equations, a trivial problem.)

Intermediate results were binary, written onto paper sheets by electrostatically modifying the resistance at 1500 locations to represent 30 of the 50-bit numbers (one equation). Each sheet could be written or read in one second. The reliability of the system was limited to about 1 error in 100,000 calculations by these units, primarily attributed to lack of control of the sheets' material characteristics. In retrospect, a solution could have been to add a parity bit to each number as written. This problem was not solved by the time Atanasoff left the university for war-related work.

Primary user input was decimal, via standard IBM 80-column punched cards, and output was decimal, via a front-panel display.

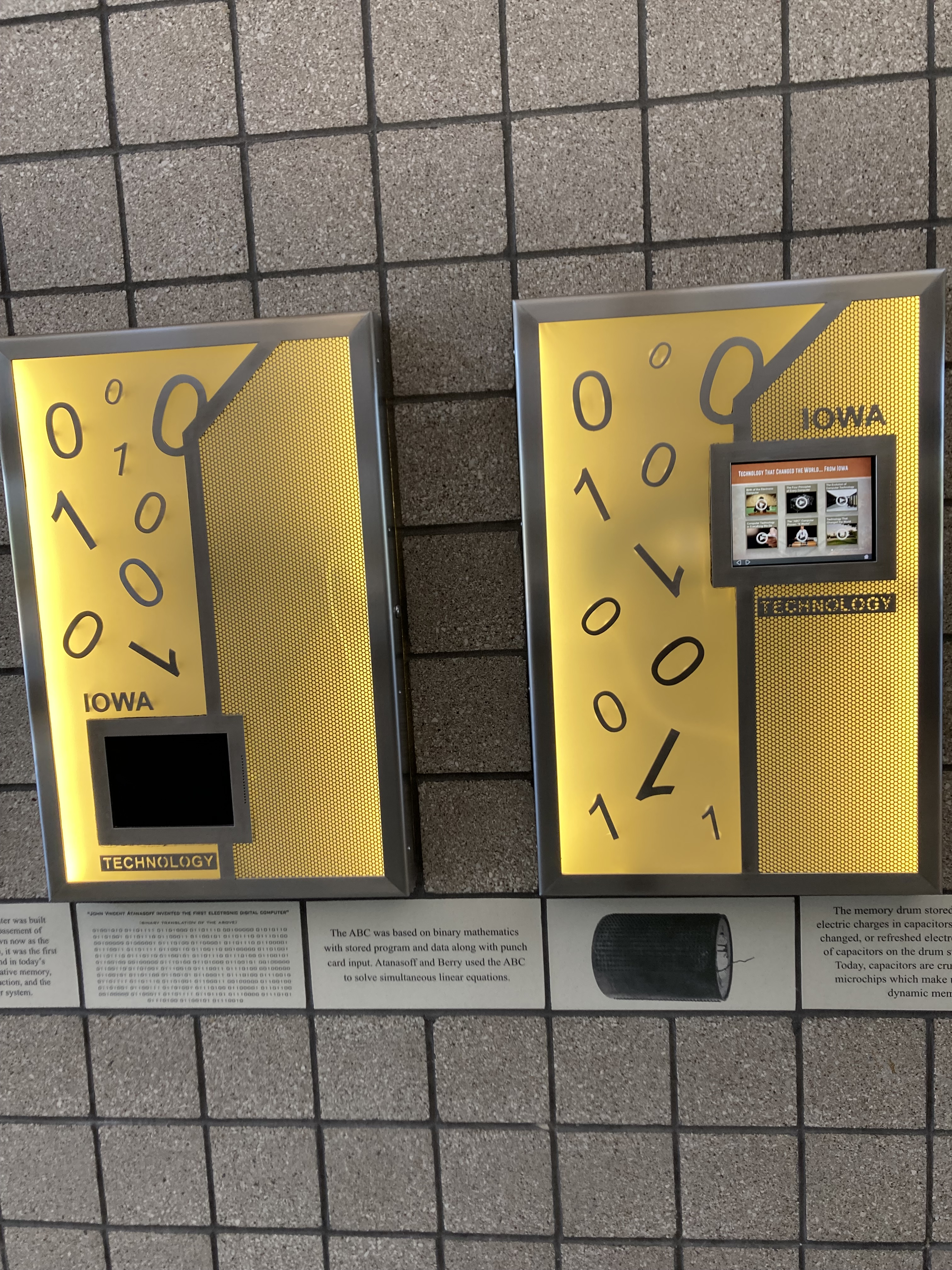
Inside display on I-35 rest stop 100 north of Des Moines honoring the ABC Computer

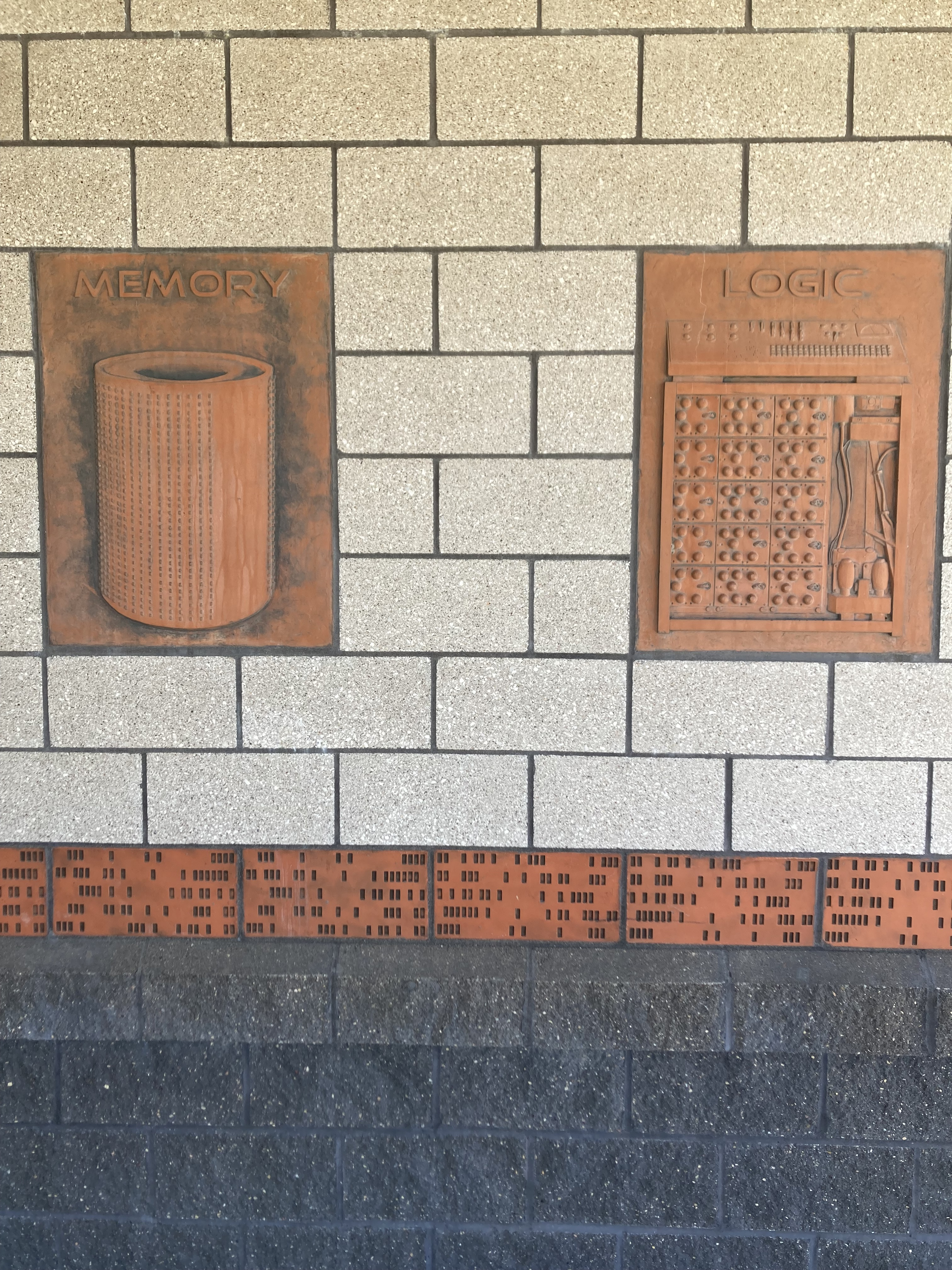
Outside display on I-35 rest stop 100 north of Des Moines honoring the ABC Computer

== Function ==
The ABC was designed for a specific purpose – the solution of systems of simultaneous linear equations. It could handle systems with up to 29 equations, a difficult problem for the time. Problems of this scale were becoming common in physics, the department in which John Atanasoff worked. The machine could be fed two linear equations with up to 29 variables and a constant term and eliminate one of the variables. This process would be repeated manually for each of the equations, which would result in a system of equations with one fewer variable. Then the whole process would be repeated to eliminate another variable.

George W. Snedecor, the head of Iowa State's Statistics Department, was very likely the first user of an electronic digital computer to solve real-world mathematics problems. He submitted many of these problems to Atanasoff.

== Patent dispute ==
On June 26, 1947, J. Presper Eckert and John Mauchly were the first to file for patent on a digital computing device (ENIAC), much to the surprise of Atanasoff. The ABC had been examined by John Mauchly in June 1941, and Isaac Auerbach, a former student of Mauchly's, alleged that it influenced his later work on ENIAC, although Mauchly denied this. The ENIAC patent did not issue until 1964, and by 1967 Honeywell sued Sperry Rand in an attempt to break the ENIAC patents, arguing that the ABC constituted prior art. The United States District Court for the District of Minnesota released its judgement on October 19, 1973, finding in Honeywell v. Sperry Rand that the ENIAC patent was a derivative of John Atanasoff's invention.

Campbell-Kelly and Aspray conclude:

The extent to which Mauchly drew on Atanasoff's ideas remains unknown, and the evidence is massive and conflicting. The ABC was quite modest technology, and it was not fully implemented. At the very least we can infer that Mauchly saw the potential significance of the ABC and that this may have led him to propose a similar, electronic solution.

The case was legally resolved on October 19, 1973, when U.S. District Judge Earl R. Larson held the ENIAC patent invalid, ruling that the ENIAC derived many basic ideas from the Atanasoff–Berry computer. Judge Larson explicitly stated:

Eckert and Mauchly did not themselves first invent the automatic electronic digital computer, but instead derived that subject matter from one Dr. John Vincent Atanasoff.

Herman Goldstine, one of the original developers of ENIAC wrote:

Atanasoff contemplated storing the coefficients of an equation in capacitors located on the periphery of a cylinder. He apparently had a prototype of his machine working "early in 1940". This machine was, it should be emphasized, probably the first use of vacuum tubes to do digital computation and was a special-purpose machine. This machine never saw the light of day as a serious tool for computation since it was somewhat premature in its engineering conception and limited in its logical one. Nonetheless it must be viewed as a great pioneering effort. Perhaps its chief importance was to influence the thinking of another physicist who was much interested in the computational process, John W. Mauchly. During the period of Atanasoff's work on his linear equation solver, Mauchly was at Ursinus College, a small school in the environs of Philadelphia. Somehow he became aware of Atanasoff's project and visited him for a week in 1941. During the visit the two men apparently went into Atanasoff's ideas in considerable detail. The discussion greatly influenced Mauchly and through him the entire history of electronic computers.

== Replica ==
The original ABC was eventually dismantled in 1948, when the university converted the basement to classrooms, and all of its pieces except for one memory drum were discarded.

In 1997, a team of researchers led by Delwyn Bluhm and John Gustafson from Ames Laboratory (located on the Iowa State University campus) finished building a working replica of the Atanasoff–Berry computer at a cost of $350,000 (equivalent to $702,000 in 2025). The replica ABC was on display in the first floor lobby of the Durham Center for Computation and Communication at Iowa State University and was subsequently exhibited at the Computer History Museum.

== See also ==
- History of computing hardware
- List of vacuum-tube computers
- Mikhail Kravchuk

== Bibliography ==
- Campbell-Kelly, Martin; Aspray, William (1996), Computer: A History of the Information Machine, New York, NY: Basic Books, ISBN 0-465-02989-2
- Edwards, John (November 22, 2010), "John Atanasoff and Clifford Berry: Inventing The ABC, A Benchmark Digital Computer", Electronic Design, 58 (16): 58–59
- Mackintosh, Allan R. (August 1988), "Dr. Atanasoff's Computer", Scientific American, vol. 259, no. 2, pp. 90–96, Bibcode:1988SciAm.259b..90M, doi:10.1038/scientificamerican0888-90, PMID 3064298
- O’Regan, Gerard (2012), A Brief History of Computing (2nd ed.), New York: Springer, ISBN 978-1-4471-2358-3
- Ralston, Anthony; Reilly, Edwin D., eds. (1993), Encyclopedia of Computer Science (3rd ed.), New York: Van Nostrand Reinhold, ISBN 0-442-27679-6
