= John Mauchly =

American physicist and computer scientist (1907–1980)

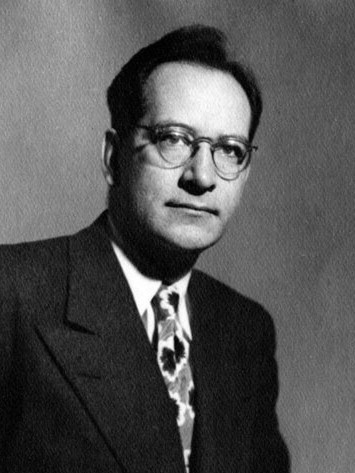
- Mauchly in 1945
- Born: August 30, 1907; Cincinnati, Ohio, US
- Died: January 8, 1980 (aged 72); Ambler, Pennsylvania, US
- Education: Johns Hopkins University
- Known for: ENIAC, UNIVAC, Mauchly's sphericity test
- Awards: Harry H. Goode Memorial Award (1966); Harold Pender Award (1973); IEEE Emanuel R. Piore Award (1978)
- Scientific career
- Fields: Physics
- Workplaces: Ursinus College; University of Pennsylvania

John William Mauchly (/ˈmɔːkli/ MAWK-lee; August 30, 1907 – January 8, 1980) was an American physicist who, along with J. Presper Eckert, designed ENIAC, the first general-purpose electronic digital computer, as well as EDVAC, BINAC and UNIVAC I, the first commercial computer made in the United States.

Together, Mauchly and Eckert started the first computer company, the Eckert–Mauchly Computer Corporation (EMCC), which allowed them to further the development of fundamental computer concepts originally conceived by members of the 1945-46 ENIAC programming team, notably Jean Bartik and Kay McNulty, including subroutines, nesting, and the first low-level assembler. They also popularized the concept of the stored program, which was formalized in John von Neumann's widely-read First Draft of a Report on the EDVAC (1945) and disseminated through the Moore School Lectures (1946). These publications influenced an explosion of computer development around the world in the late 1940s.

== Biography ==
John W. Mauchly was born on August 30, 1907, to Sebastian and Rachel (Scheidemantel) Mauchly in Cincinnati, Ohio. His family was of German descent, and his father spoke German, but Mauchly didn't grow up speaking it as it was not spoken in the family. He moved with his parents and sister, Helen Elizabeth (Betty), at an early age to Chevy Chase, Maryland, when Sebastian Mauchly obtained a position at the Carnegie Institution of Washington as head of its Section of Terrestrial Electricity. As a youth, Mauchly was interested in science, and in particular with electricity, and as a young teenager was known to fix neighbors' electric systems. Mauchly attended E.V. Brown Elementary School in Chevy Chase and McKinley Technical High School in Washington, DC. At McKinley, Mauchly was extremely active in the debate team, was a member of the national honor society, and became editor-in-chief of the school's newspaper, Tech Life. After graduating from high school in 1925, he earned a scholarship to study engineering at Johns Hopkins University. He subsequently transferred to the physics department, and without completing his undergraduate degree, instead earned a Ph.D. in physics in 1932.

From 1932 to 1933, Mauchly served as a research assistant at Johns Hopkins University where he concentrated on calculating energy levels of the formaldehyde spectrum. Mauchly's teaching career truly began in 1933 at Ursinus College where he was appointed head of the physics department, where he was, in fact, the only staff member.

In the summer of 1941, Mauchly took a Defense Training Course for Electronics at the University of Pennsylvania Moore School of Electrical Engineering. There he met the lab instructor, J. Presper Eckert (1919–1995), with whom he would form a long-standing working partnership. Following the course, Mauchly was hired as an instructor of electrical engineering and in 1943, he was promoted to assistant professor of electrical engineering. Following the outbreak of World War II, the United States Army Ordnance Department contracted the Moore School to build an electronic computer which, as proposed by Mauchly and Eckert, would accelerate the recomputation of artillery firing tables.

In 1959, Mauchly left Sperry Rand and started Mauchly Associates, Inc. One of Mauchly Associates' notable achievements was the development of the Critical Path Method (CPM) which provided for automated construction scheduling. Mauchly also set up a consulting organization, Dynatrend, in 1967 and worked as a consultant to Sperry UNIVAC from 1973 until his death in 1980.

John Mauchly died on January 8, 1980, in Ambler, Pennsylvania, during heart surgery and following a long illness. His first wife, Mary Augusta Walzl, a mathematician, whom he married on December 30, 1930, drowned in 1946. John and Mary Mauchly had two children, James (Jimmy) and Sidney. In 1948, Mauchly married Kathleen Kay McNulty (1921–2006), one of the six original ENIAC programmers; they had five children Sara (Sally), Kathleen (Kathy), John, Virginia (Gini), and Eva.

== Moore School ==
In 1941 Mauchly took a course in wartime electronics at the Moore School of Electrical Engineering, part of the University of Pennsylvania. There he met J. Presper Eckert, a recent Moore School graduate. Mauchly accepted a teaching position at the Moore School, which was a center for wartime computing. Eckert encouraged Mauchly to believe that vacuum tubes could be made reliable with proper engineering practices. The critical problem that was consuming the Moore School was ballistics: the calculation of firing tables for the large number of new guns that the U.S. Army was developing for the war effort.

=== ENIAC ===
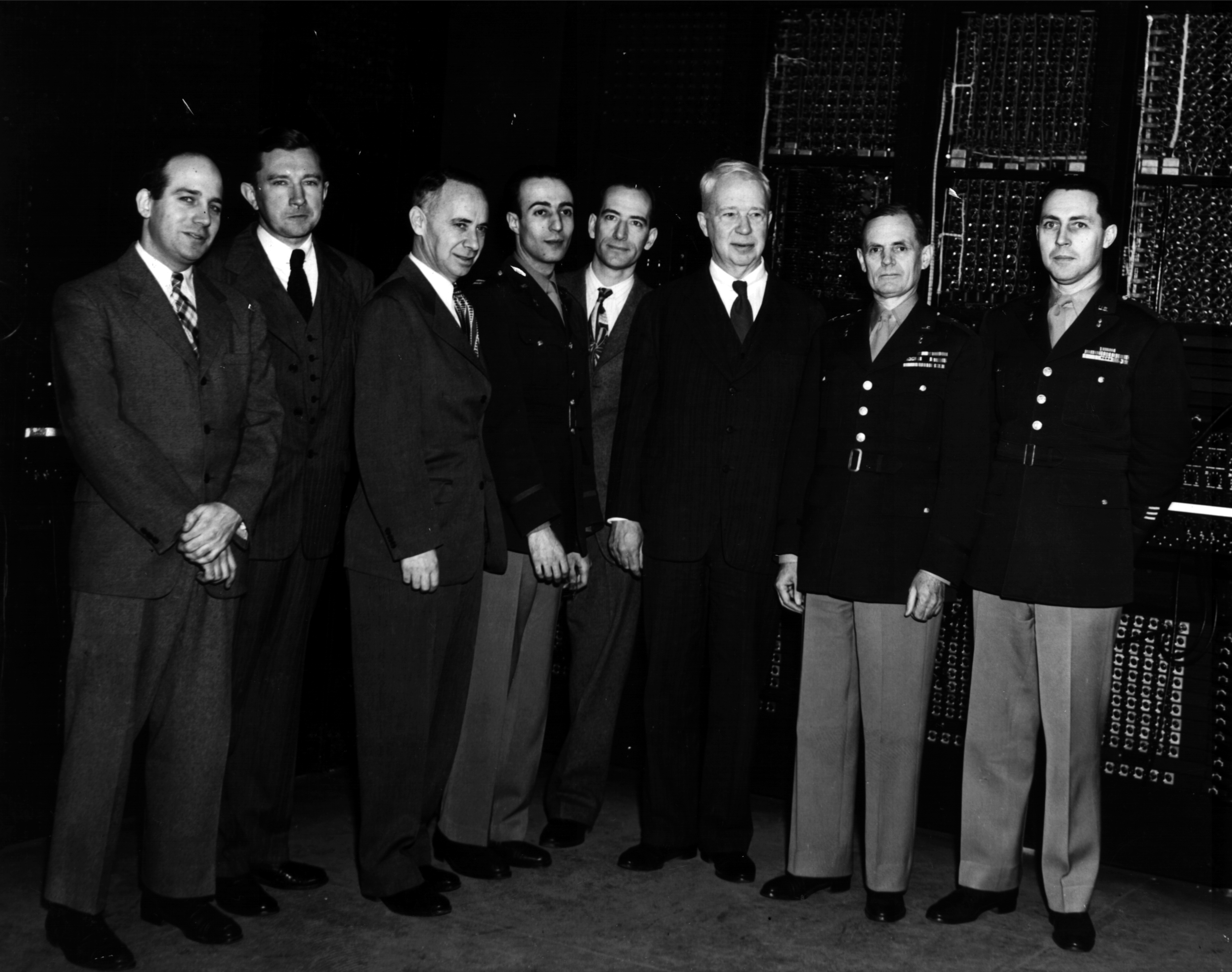
The ENIAC contributors; Mauchy is in the center, fourth from the right

In 1942 Mauchly wrote a memo proposing the building of a general-purpose electronic computer. The proposal, which circulated within the Moore School (but the significance of which was not immediately recognized), emphasized the enormous speed advantage that could be gained by using digital electronics with no moving parts. Lieutenant Herman Goldstine, who was the liaison between the United States Army and Moore School, picked up on the idea and asked Mauchly to write a formal proposal. In April 1943, the Army contracted with the Moore School to build the Electronic Numerical Integrator and Computer (ENIAC). Mauchly led the conceptual design while Eckert led the hardware engineering on ENIAC. A number of other talented engineers contributed to the confidential "Project PX".

Because of its high-speed calculations, ENIAC could solve problems that were previously unsolvable. It was roughly a thousand times faster than the existing technology. It could add 5,000 numbers or do 357 10-digit multiplications in one second.

ENIAC could be programmed to perform sequences and loops of addition, subtraction, multiplication, division, square-root, input/output functions, and conditional branches. Programming was initially accomplished with patch cords and switches, and reprogramming took days. It was redesigned in 1948 to allow the use of stored programs with some loss in speed.

In 2002, for his work on ENIAC he was inducted, posthumously, into the National Inventors Hall of Fame.

== EDVAC ==
The ENIAC design was frozen in 1944 to allow construction. Eckert and Mauchly were already aware of the limitations of the machine and began plans on a second computer, to be called EDVAC. By January 1945 they had procured a contract to build this stored-program computer. Eckert had proposed a mercury delay-line memory to store both program and data. Later that year, mathematician John von Neumann learned of the project and joined in some of the engineering discussions. He produced what was understood to be an internal document describing the EDVAC.

The term von Neumann architecture arose from von Neumann's paper First Draft of a Report on the EDVAC. Dated June 30, 1945, it was an early written account of a general-purpose stored-program computing machine (the EDVAC). Goldstine, in a move that was to become controversial, removed any reference to Eckert or Mauchly and distributed the document to a number of von Neumann's associates across the country. The ideas became widely known within the very small world of computer designers.

Besides the lack of credit, Eckert and Mauchly suffered additional setbacks due to Goldstine's actions. The ENIAC patent U.S. patent 3,120,606, issued in 1964 was filed on June 26, 1947, and granted February 4, 1964, but the public disclosure of design details of EDVAC in the First Draft (which were also common to ENIAC) was later cited as one cause for the 1973 invalidation of the ENIAC patent.

== The Moore School Lectures ==
In March 1946, just after the ENIAC was announced, the Moore School decided to change their patent policy, in order to gain commercial rights to any future and past computer development there. Eckert and Mauchly decided this was unacceptable; they resigned. However they had already been contracted to do one more thing at the Moore School: to give a series of talks on computer design.

The course "The Theory and Techniques for Design of Digital Computers", ran from July 8 to August 31, 1946. Eckert gave 11 of the lectures; Mauchly and Goldstine each delivered 6. "The Moore School Lectures", as they came to be known, were attended by representatives from the army, the navy, MIT, the National Bureau of Standards, Cambridge University, Columbia, Harvard, the Institute for Advanced Study, IBM, Bell Labs, Eastman Kodak, General Electric, and National Cash Register. A number of the attendees were to later go on to develop computers, such as Maurice Wilkes, of Cambridge, who built EDSAC.

== Eckert–Mauchly Computer Corporation ==
In 1947 Eckert and Mauchly formed the first computer company, the Eckert–Mauchly Computer Corporation (EMCC); Mauchly was president. They secured a contract with the National Bureau of Standards to build an "EDVAC II", later named UNIVAC.

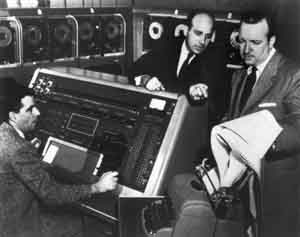
A picture of UNIVAC I borrowed for the 1952 U.S. Presidential election results analysis by CBS news team. J. Presper Eckert (c.), co-designer of the UNIVAC, and Harold Sweeny of the US Census Bureau, with Walter Cronkite

UNIVAC, the first computer designed for business applications, had many significant technical advantages such as magnetic tape for mass storage. As an interim product, the company created and delivered a smaller computer, BINAC, but were still in a shaky financial situation.

The company was purchased by Remington Rand in 1950 and became the UNIVAC division. Mauchly remained the Director of Applications and worked on weather forecasting projects. In 1959, he left to create Mauchly Associates.

== Software ==
Very early in the history of EMCC, John Mauchly assumed responsibility for programming, coding, and applications for the planned computer systems. His early interaction with representatives of the Census Bureau in 1944 and 1945, and discussion with people interested in statistics, weather prediction, and various business problems in 1945 and 1946 focused his attention on the need to provide new users with the software to accomplish their objectives. He knew it would be difficult to sell computers without application materials, and without training in how to use the systems. And so, EMCC began to assemble a staff of mathematicians interested in coding in early 1947. (from Norberg)

Mauchly's interest lay in the application of computers, as well as to their architecture and organization. His experience with programming the ENIAC and its successors led him to create Short Code (see "The UNIVAC SHORT CODE"), the first programming language actually used on a computer (predated by Zuse's conceptual Plankalkul). It was a pseudocode interpreter for mathematical problems proposed in 1949 and ran on the UNIVAC I and II. Mauchly's belief in the importance of languages led him to hire Grace Murray Hopper to develop a compiler for the UNIVAC.

John Mauchly has also been credited for being the first one using the verb "to program" in his 1942 paper on electronic computing, although in the context of ENIAC, not in its current meaning.

== Career ==
Mauchly stayed involved in computers for the rest of his life. He was a founding member and president of the Association for Computing Machinery (ACM) and also helped found the Society for Industrial and Applied Mathematics (SIAM), serving as its fourth president. The Eckert–Mauchly Corporation was bought by Remington Rand in 1950 and for ten years Mauchly remained as Director of Univac Applications Research. Leaving in 1959 he formed Mauchly Associates, a consulting company that later introduced the critical path method (CPM) for construction scheduling by computer. In 1967 he founded Dynatrend, a computer consulting organization. In 1973 he became a consultant to Sperry Univac.

== Awards ==
Mauchly received numerous award and honors. He was a life member of the Franklin Institute, the National Academy of Engineering and the Society for Advancement of Management. He was elected a Fellow of the IRE, a predecessor society of IEEE, in 1957, and was a Fellow of the American Statistical Association. He received an LLD (Hon) degree from the University of Pennsylvania and aDSc(Hon) degree from Ursinus College. He was a recipient of the Philadelphia Award, the Scott Medal, the Goode Medal of AFIPS (American Federation of Information Processing Societies), the Pennsylvania Award, the Emanual R. Piore Award, the Howard N. Potts Medal, and numerous other awards.

== Patent controversy ==
Mauchly and Eckert's patent on the ENIAC was invalidated by U.S. Federal Court decision in October, 1973 for several reasons. Some had to do with the time between publication (the First Draft) and the patent filing date (1947). The federal judge who presided over the case ruled that "the subject matter was derived" from the earlier Atanasoff–Berry computer (ABC). This statement has become the center of a controversy.

Critics note that while the court said that the ABC was the first electronic digital computer, it did not define the term computer. It had originally referred to a person who computes, but was adapted to apply to a machine.

Critics of the court decision also note that there is, at a component level, nothing in common between the two machines. The ABC was binary; the ENIAC was decimal. The ABC used regenerative drum memory; The ENIAC used electronic decade counters. The ABC used its vacuum tubes to implement a binary serial adder, while the ENIAC used tubes to implement a complete set of decimal operations. The ENIAC's general-purpose instruction set, together with the ability to automatically sequence through them, made it a general-purpose computer. However, the later EDVAC computer, developed without the immediate pressures of wartime projects, harked back more to the ABC in that it was a binary computer employing regenerative memory.

Proponents for the court decision emphasize that the testimony established that Mauchly definitely visited Atanasoff's lab at Iowa State College, had complete access to Atanasoff's machine and the documents describing it. Letters he wrote to Atanasoff show that he was at one time at least considering building on Atanasoff's approach.

Mauchly consistently maintained that it was the use of high-speed electronic flip-flops in cosmic-ray counting devices at Swarthmore College that gave him the idea for computing at electronic speeds.

== See also ==
- Mauchly's sphericity test
- List of pioneers in computer science
