= Educational toy =

Plaything intended to stimulate learning

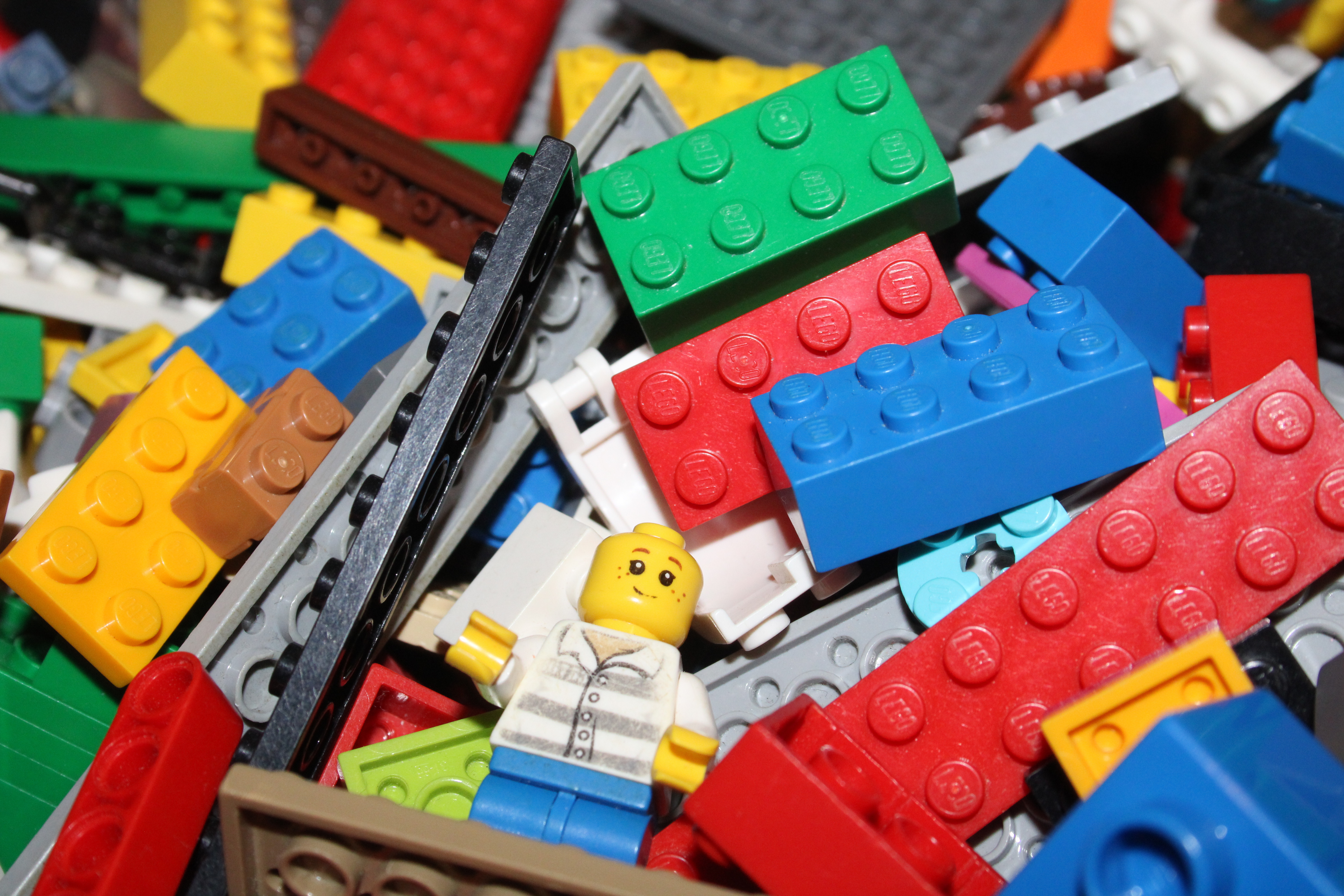
Lego bricks encourage learning through play.

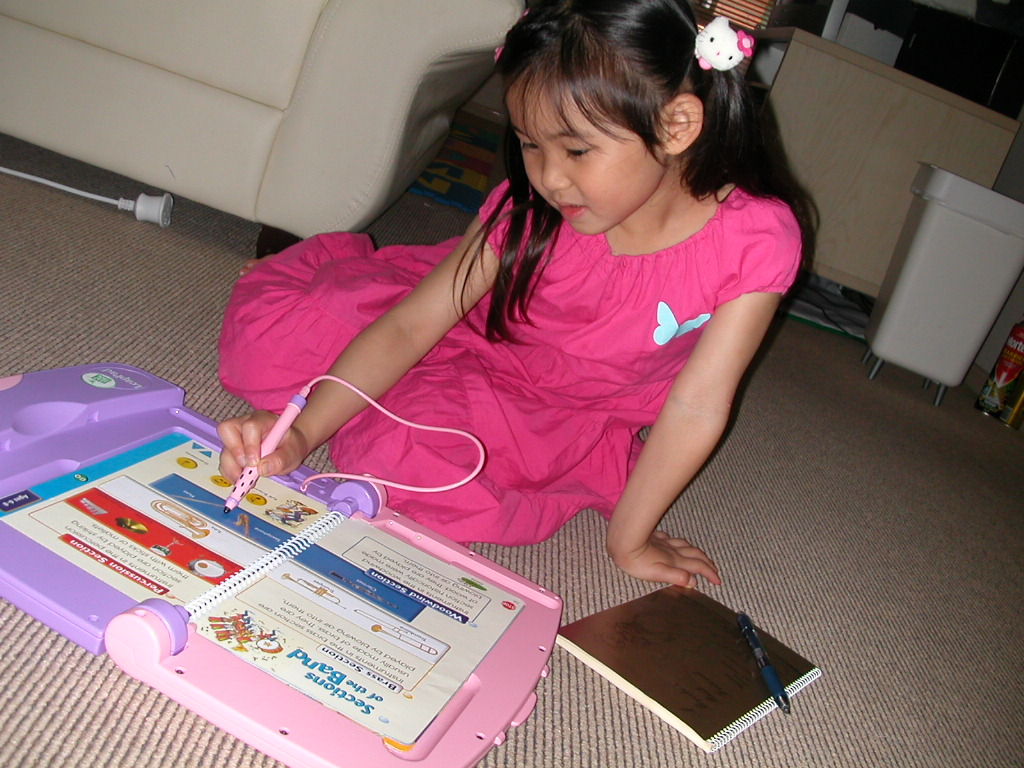
A girl with a LeapPad

Educational toys (sometimes also called "instructive toys") are objects of play, generally designed for children. Educational toys help with motivation, helping kids use their imagination while still pulling in the real world. These toys are important tools that offer news ways for kids to interact and stimulate learning. They are often intended to meet an educational purpose such as helping a child develop a particular skill or teaching a child about a particular subject. They often simplify, miniaturize, or even model activities and objects used by adults.

Although children are constantly interacting with and learning about the world, many of the objects they interact with and learn from are not toys. Toys are generally considered to be specifically built for children's use. A child might play with and learn from a rock or a stick, but it would not be considered an educational toy because 1) it is a natural object, not a designed one, and 2) it has no expected educational purpose.

The difference lies in perception or reality of the toy's intention and value. An educational toy is expected to educate. It is expected to instruct, promote intellectuality, emotional or physical development. An educational toy should teach a child about a particular subject or help a child develop a particular skill. More toys are designed with the child's education and development in mind today than ever before.

== History ==
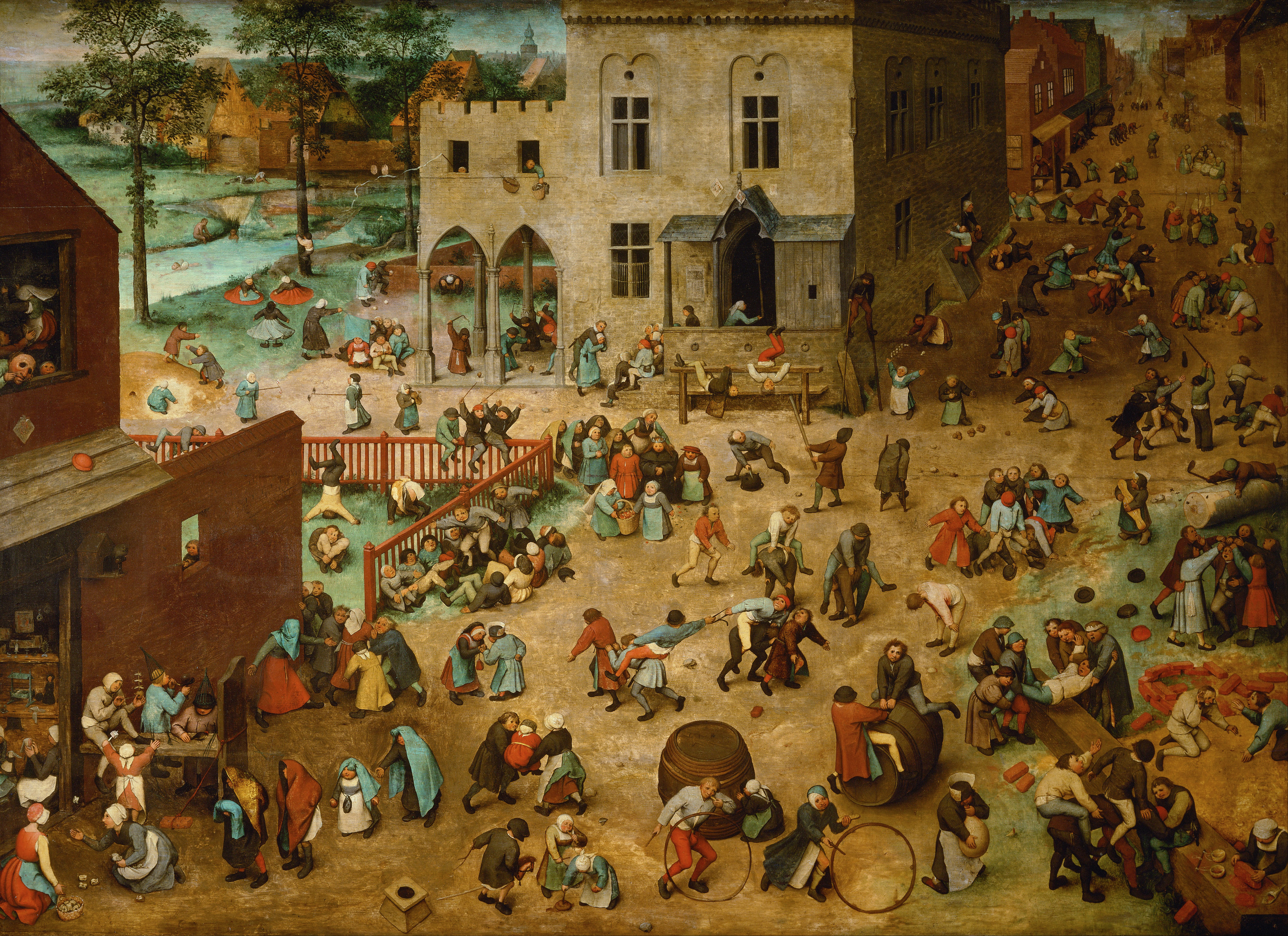
Children’s Games, by Pieter Bruegel the Elder (1560)

Toys have changed substantially throughout history, as has the concept of childhood itself. In Toys as Culture (1986), anthropologist Brian Sutton Smith discusses the history of toys and states that "in multifarious ways toys are mediating these cultural conflicts within the personal lives of children". Educational toys in particular tend to reflect the cultural concerns of their time.

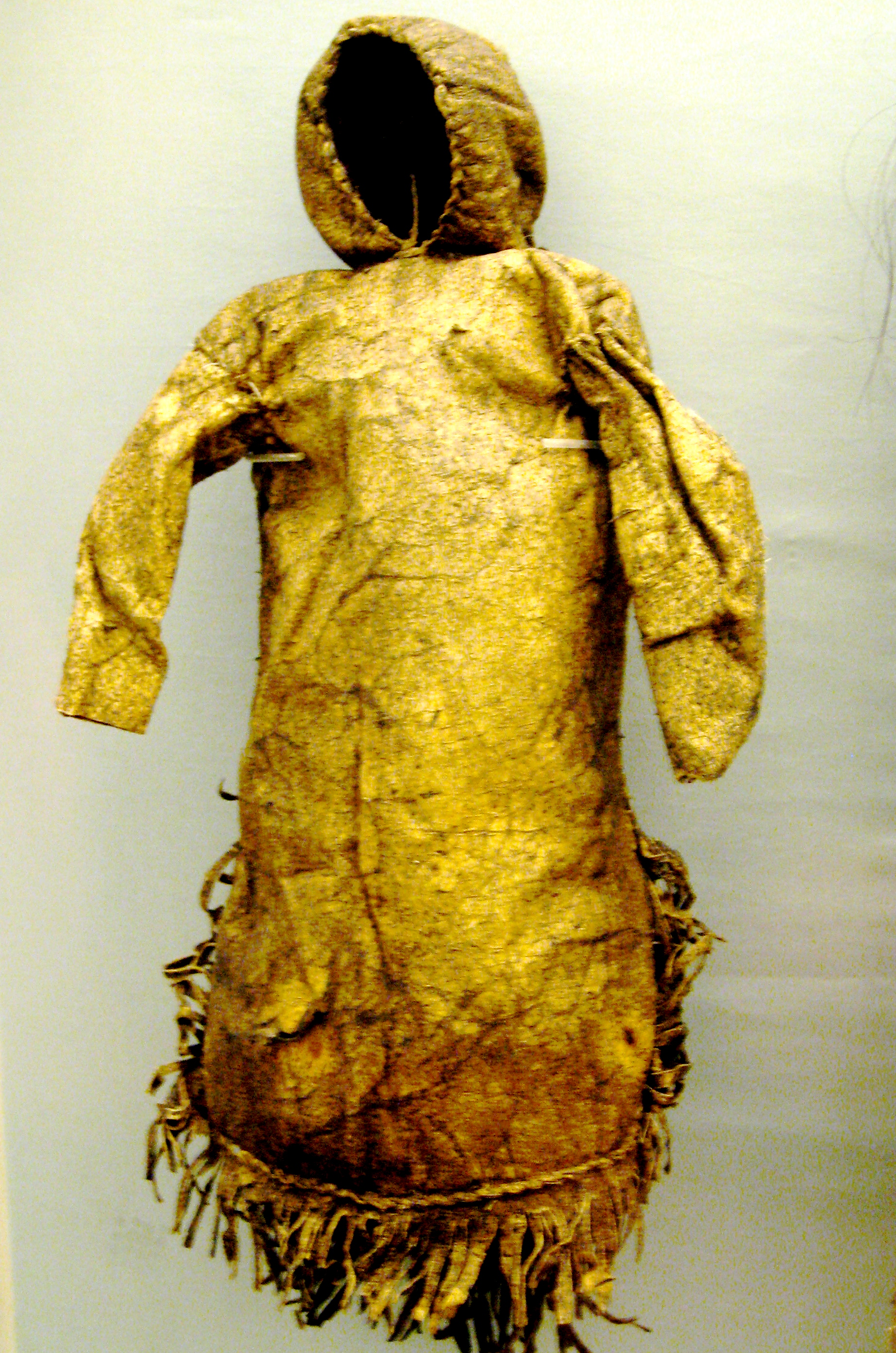
Inuit children's doll

Research on the history of toys and their use tends to focus on western cultures, but work has also been done on North Africa and the Sahara. Puppets or dolls made of wood, clay, wax or cloth may be the earliest known toys. Archaeologists have found them in sites from Egypt, Greece and Rome, and Antonia Fraser emphasizes their universality.

Dolls can be seen as an early "educational toy" because dolls acted as substitutes, allowing children to learn to care for living babies and children. Similarly, toy bows and arrows or other weapons acted as substitutes for real weapons, enabling children to develop skills needed for hunting or fighting.

Up until the 20th century, however, manufactured toys were not readily available, and most often were owned by wealthy families. Moulded miniature dishes and toy soldiers have been found in England dating to as early as 1300. There are records of wealthy medieval children owning elaborate toy houses and military toys, which could enable them to mimic adult activities such as managing a household or enacting a siege.

Children's toys can show perspective on childhood's and give information on consumer culture. In the 1990s toy dolls took off. Feminist research began to grow on material culture. For example, the popular brand, American Girl Doll provided more research over femininity and certain toys.

Nonetheless, "We often forget that throughout history, children have happily played without toys and manufactured playthings." Children improvised a wide variety of toys and games using whatever came to hand, including fences, barrels, sticks, stones, and sand. Both children and adults played games such as backgammon, dice, chess and cards, which helped to develop manual dexterity, memory, and strategy. In 1560, Pieter Bruegel the Elder painted Children's Games. He depicts around 200 children in at least 75 play activities. Only a few activities involved toys made specifically for children, and even fewer might be classed as "educational toys": dolls, simple musical instruments and a water gun used to shoot at a bird.

=== Locke's Blocks ===
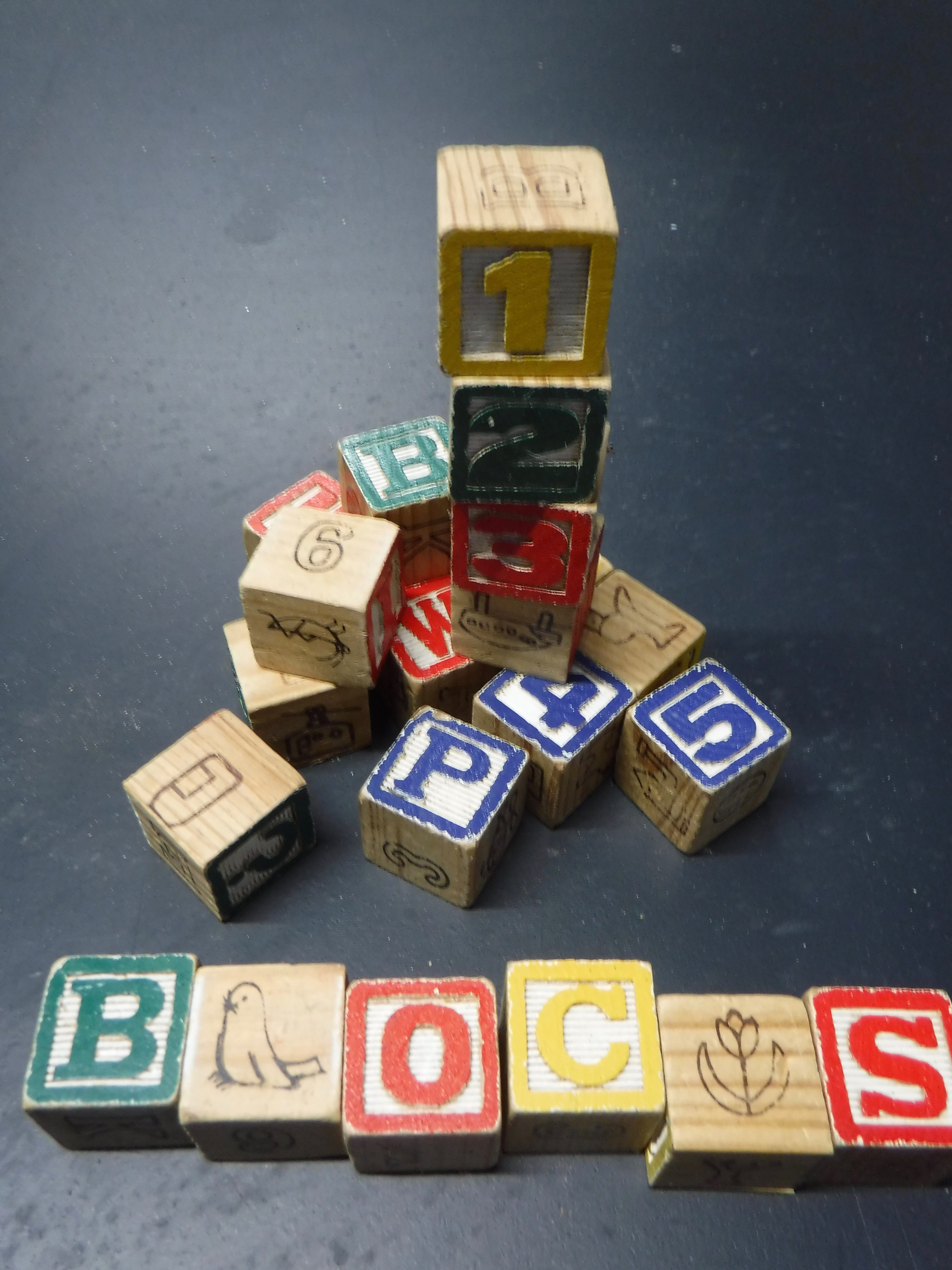
Alphabet blocks

The identification of specific toys as having an explicitly educational purpose dates to the 1700s. In 1693, in Some Thoughts Concerning Education, liberal philosopher John Locke asserted that educational toys could enhance children's enjoyment of learning their letters: "There may be dice and play-things, with the letters on them to teach children the alphabet by playing; and twenty other ways may be found, suitable to their particular tempers, to make this kind of learning a sport to them." This type of block, one of the first explicitly educational toys, is often identified as "Locke's Blocks".

=== Dissected Maps ===
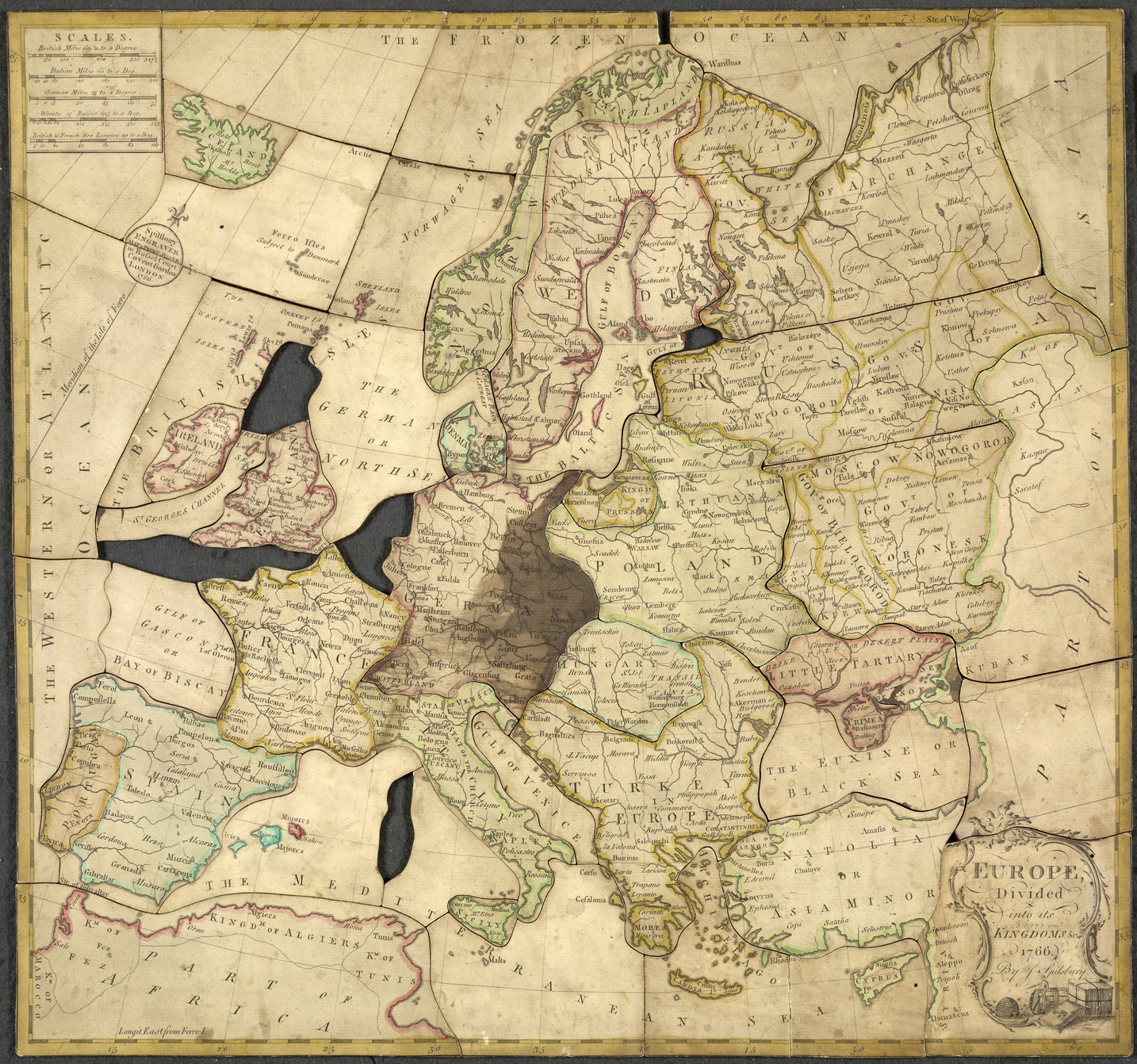
Dissected map of Europe, John Spilsbury, 1766

French educator Jeanne-Marie Le Prince de Beaumont may be the earliest inventor of the jigsaw puzzle or "Dissected Map". Records indicate that she used some type of wooden map to teach girls geography in the 1750s. However, since no examples of her maps still exist, it is impossible to confirm that they were "dissected" into pieces. British cartographer John Spilsbury is generally credited with inventing the jigsaw puzzle or "dissected map" in 1766. He intended it to be an educational tool for geography.

=== A Rational Toy-Shop ===
In Practical Education (1798), Maria Edgeworth and her father Richard Lovell Edgeworth described a "rational toy-shop" where educational toys would be sold. They proposed that such a shop should sell materials for a wide variety of activities including carpentry, handicrafts, gardening, chemistry, and natural history. An important advocate for the education of women, Maria Edgeworth's ideas about science and education were influenced by the philosopher, chemist, and educator Joseph Priestley and the exciting discoveries of the first chemical revolution. Edgeworth even suggested that children be given a play area for loud and messy educational activities, to support the development of "the young philosopher", who she clearly expected to be well-to-do.

To those who acquire habits of observation, every thing that is to be seen or heard, becomes a source of amusement... most well ordered families allow their horses and their dogs to have houses to themselves; cannot one room be allotted to the children of the family? If they are to learn chemistry, mineralogy, botany, or mechanics; if they are to take sufficient bodily exercise without tormenting the whole family with noise, a room should be provided for them.

In contrast to the Edgeworths, Isaac Taylor in Home education (1838) and Charlotte Mary Yonge in Womankind (1876) championed the idea of less structured, more imaginative play. The range of manufactured toys broadened during the Victorian era but toys continued to be costly and belong to the wealthy. A toy might cost as much as a working man's wage for a week.

=== Froebel's gifts ===
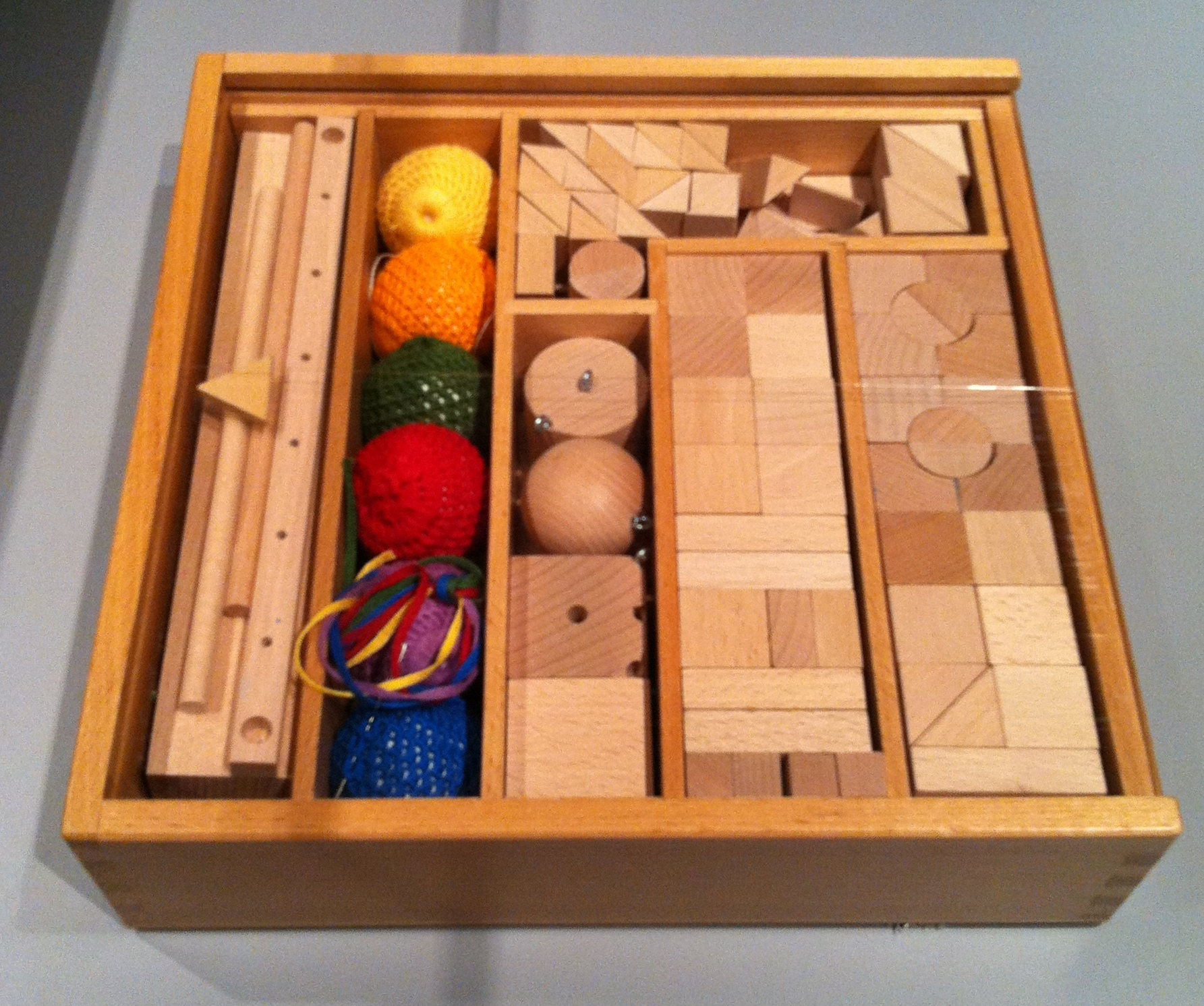
Replica Fröbel Gifts

The center of toy making in the 1800s was Germany, renowned for its fine craftsmanship. Between 1836 and 1850, German educator Friedrich Wilhelm August Fröbel introduced a set of specially shaped geometric solids which he called "gifts" and less solid materials such as foldable papers which he called "occupations". Through interaction with these manipulatives, all five senses were stimulated. They were intended to support learning of concepts such as number, size, shape, weight, and cause and effect. Froebel also established the first "Kindergarten". It provided care and education for pre-school children whose parents were absent at work during the day.

By 1880, the wooden blocks designed by Froebel had inspired the development of Anchor Stone Blocks (German: Anker-Steinbaukasten) made of artificial stone in Germany by the Lilienthal brothers. These early construction toy sets have remained in almost continuous production since then, and modern components are still compatible with the durable antique elements made more than a century ago.

=== La Science Amusante ===
French engineer Arthur Good (under the pen name "Tom Tit") published weekly articles about La Science Amusante, or Amusing Science in the French magazine L’Illustration. They were collected and published starting in 1889. His geometrical demonstrations, craft projects, and physics experiments could be carried out with everyday household materials.

=== Montessori's manipulatives ===
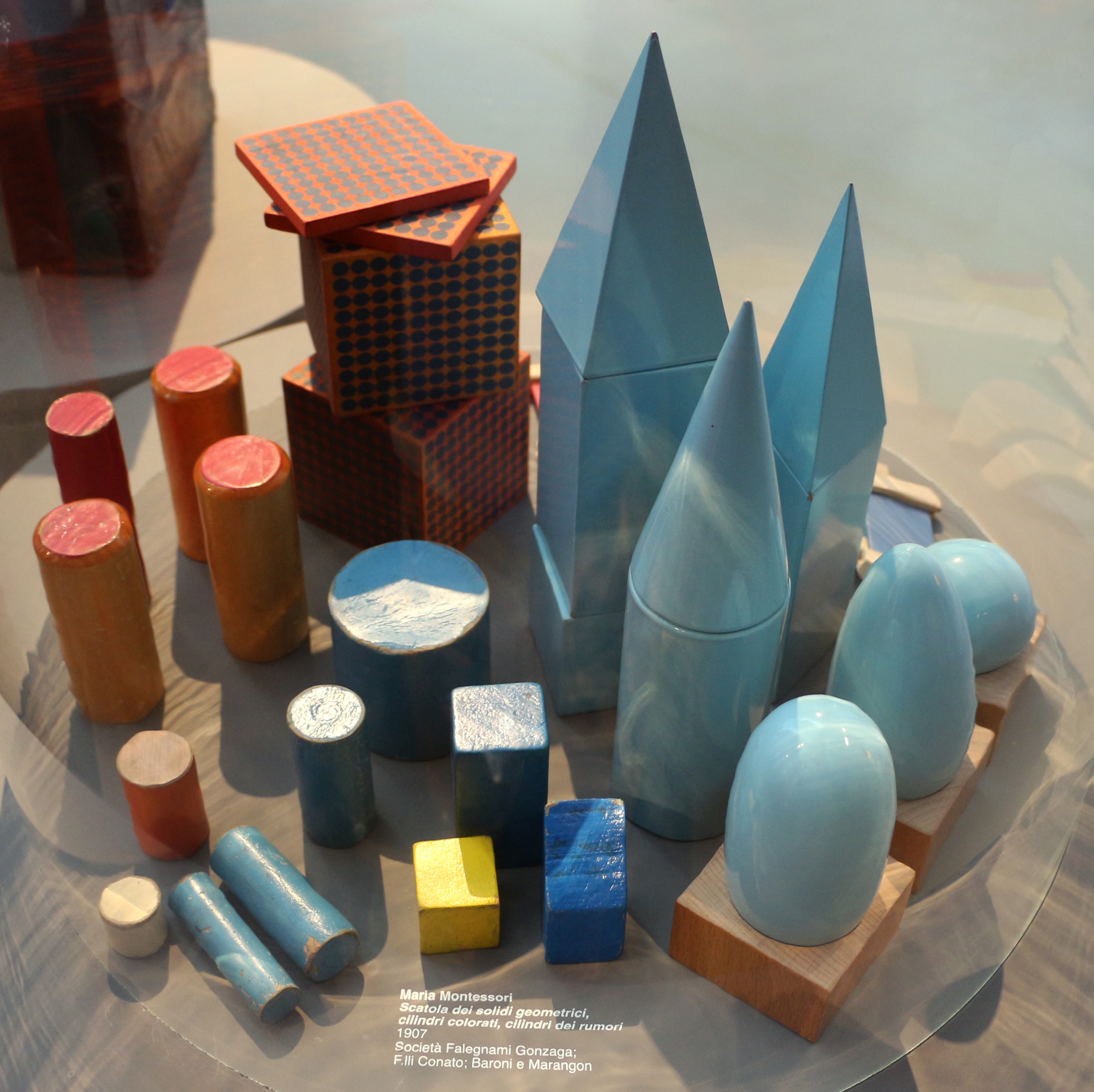
Some of Montessori's many manipulatives

A wide array of manipulatives was introduced in the early 20th century by Maria Montessori. Based on her work in Italy, her book The Montessori method was translated into English and published in 1912. Montessori's curriculum focused primarily on tactile and perceptual learning in the early years, and was based on developmental theories and work with students. She emphasized practical exercises using ready-to-hand materials such as pouring rice or tying a shoelace. She also developed sets of Montessori sensorial materials, manipulatives for learning mathematics and other skills and concepts. Today, Montessori's methods are used in both homes and schools, and her manipulatives have been extensively studied. Her work was strongly motivated by slum conditions and the social and economic disadvantages facing poor women and their children. The Montessori method formed the basis for the creation of educational toys busy boards.

=== Construction sets ===
During World War I (1914–1918), countries such as Great Britain embargoed German goods, including toys. Later, toy-making businesses were established in Britain and other countries, in some cases employing ex-soldiers. Britain became a principal supplier of toys, to be followed by America, and later Japan and China. Toys became cheaper and accessible to more people. However, the emergence of an industrialized toy manufacturing industry in Canada, Britain, and elsewhere was disrupted by the Great Depression.

Meccano, Erector Sets, Tinkertoy, and Lincoln Logs all appeared in the early 20th century, and were promoted as developing fine motor skills, encouraging free play and creativity, and introducing children to engineering and construction ideas.

Frank Hornby of Lancashire, England designed the construction toy Meccano in 1899 to encourage his children's interest in mechanical engineering. Patented as "Mechanics Made Easy" in 1901, it became known as "Meccano" in 1907. Educators were aware of societal changes caused by industrialism, and hoped to interest youngsters in possible new careers.

In 1913, A. C. Gilbert introduced the Erector Set with the first national advertising campaign for a toy. The Erector Set contained girders and bolts that could be assembled into miniature buildings or other structures, and was acclaimed as fostering creativity in constructive play. In 1924, it was redesigned to include miniature electric motors and other pieces which could be used to create all sorts of self-actuated machines.

Tinkertoy was developed and patented in 1914 by Charles H. Pajeau of Evanston, Illinois. Sets contained interlockable wooden spools and rods that could be combined to make a wide variety of constructions. They were marketed in different sets, according to the types and numbers of pieces included, allowing them to be both interoperable and identifiable by difficulty level (e.g. junior, big boy, grad). In addition to use as a construction toy, they have been used by scientists and students to model molecules, and even to build a primitive computer.

Lincoln Logs were introduced in 1918 by John Lloyd Wright, second son of the architect Frank Lloyd Wright. They were inspired by structural work for the second Imperial Hotel, built in Tokyo, Japan. For the hotel, Frank Lloyd Wright designed a system of interlocking timber beams that were intended protect the hotel against earthquakes by allowing it to sway without collapsing. His son adapted the idea to enable children to build constructions that would stand up to rough play. In the 1950s, Lincoln Logs were one of the first toys to be marketed on television.

Throughout the early part of the 20th century, a variety of new materials such as plastics were developed, and manufacturing processes became increasingly automated. This supported the development of educational toys, including construction toys, since it enabled the standardization of pieces. Toys such as Tinkertoy and Lincoln Logs, which were originally made of wood, were later also made in plastic versions.

In the mid-1950s, more explicitly engineering-themed construction toys appeared, including plastic girders, columns, and panels that could be assembled into a model curtain wall skyscraper. Later, this Girder and Panel structural system was extended to a Hydro-Dynamic setup by adding pipes, valves, tanks, nozzles, and pumps to allow construction of model plumbing, HVAC, and chemical engineering systems like a simulated distillation column. Other extensions of the system supported suburban-style housing developments (Build-A-Home), or monorail transportation systems (Skyrail).

The building toy Lego was originally developed by Ole Kirk Christiansen in Billund, Denmark, in the 1930s. The name Lego is said to be based on the Danish phrase leg godt, or "play well", and is also translatable in Latin as "I study, I put together". By the 1950s, the sets were becoming available beyond Denmark and Germany, eventually being marketed worldwide and surpassing all previous construction toys in popularity. Lego bricks are versatile and are used by adults as well as children to make a near-limitless variety of creations. The company has created a line of kits for complex architectural structures such as the Taj Mahal. It has also partnered widely to create theme-based kits for franchises such as Star Wars.

In the late 1960s, Fischertechnik introduced what would eventually become a versatile and powerful set of modular construction components, incorporating sophisticated pneumatic, electrical, electronic, and robotic capabilities. The company's products also achieved some success in the hobbyist and school markets, including vocational education programs, but was overshadowed by Lego in the consumer segment.

A collection of 3D-printable adapters called the Free Universal Construction Kit was included in Pirouette: Turning Points in Design, a 2025 exhibition at the Museum of Modern Art, in New York. The work, by Golan Levin and Shawn Sims, facilitates the interoperability of popular toy construction systems such as the mating of Legos with Tinkertoys or Lincoln Logs, encouraging "totally new forms of intercourse between otherwise closed systems."

=== Gallery ===
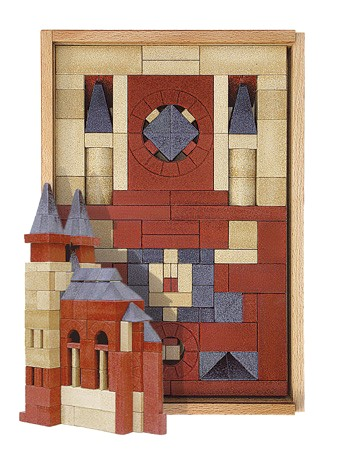
Anchor Stone Blocks from 1880 are still compatible with modern sets.

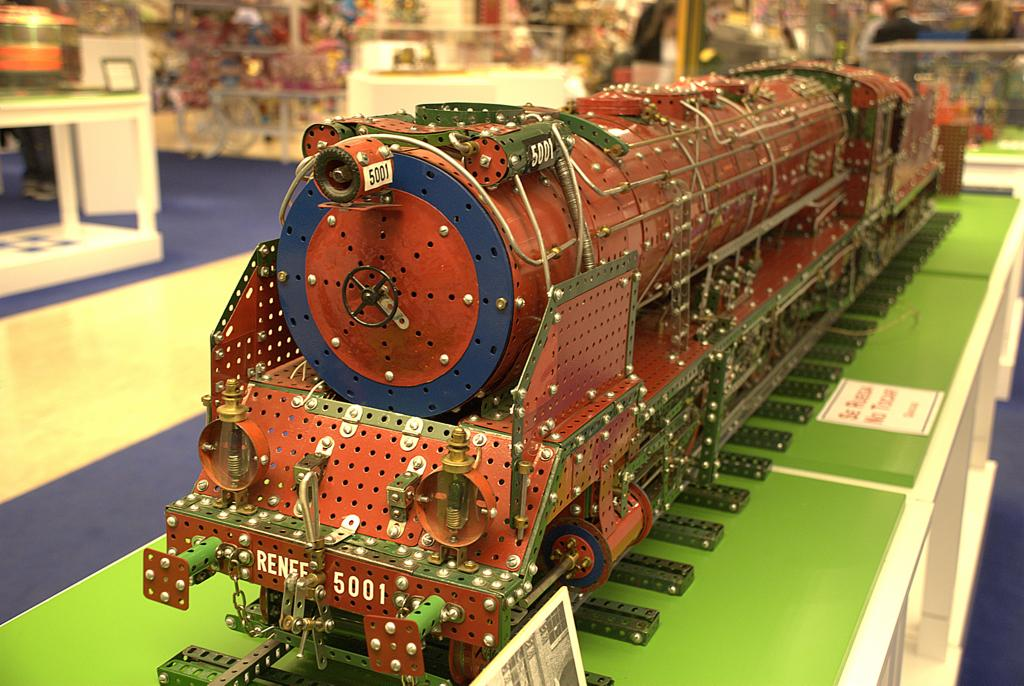
Model steam locomotive built with Meccano

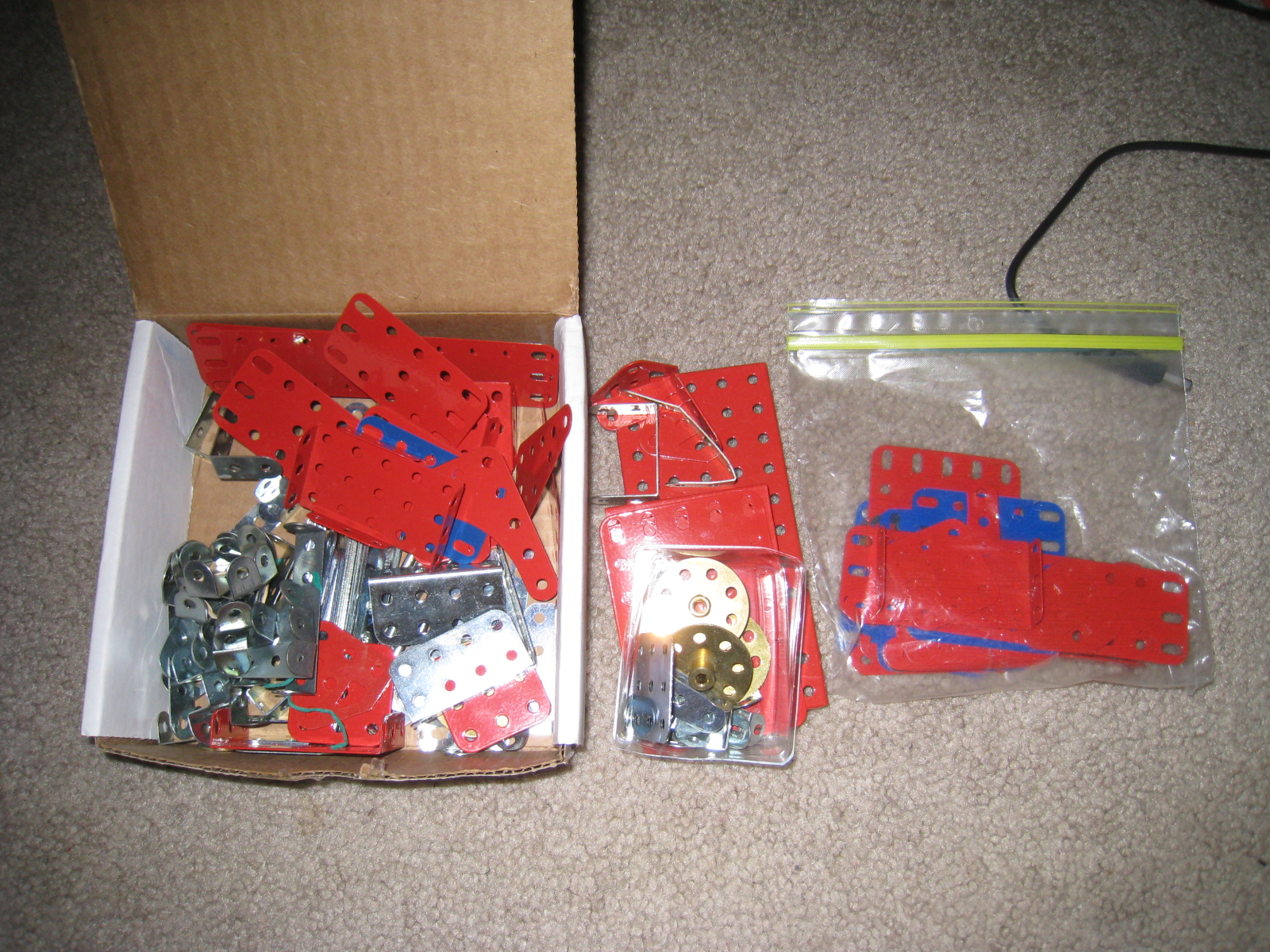
A very basic Erector Set kit of parts

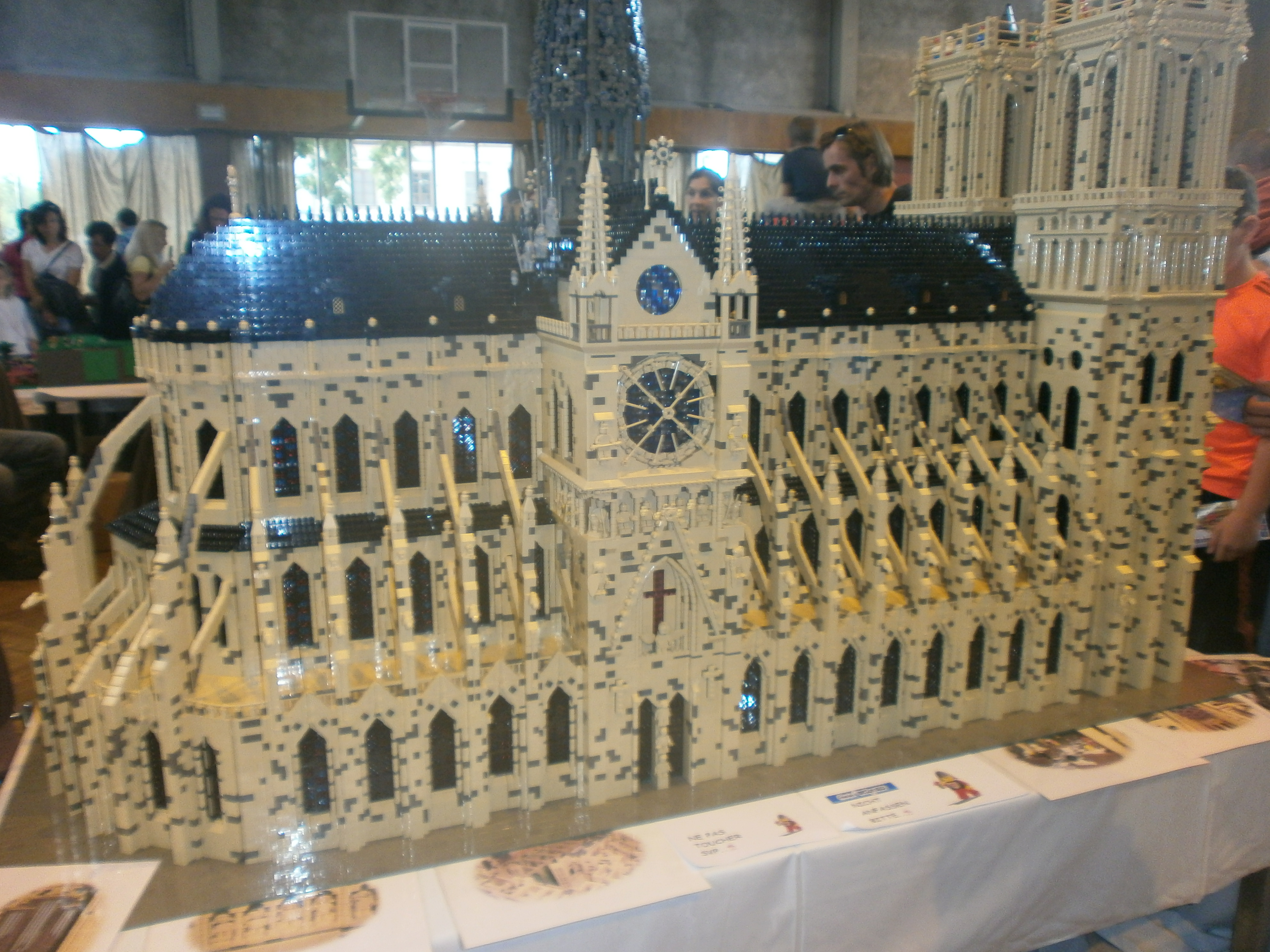
Lego cathedral

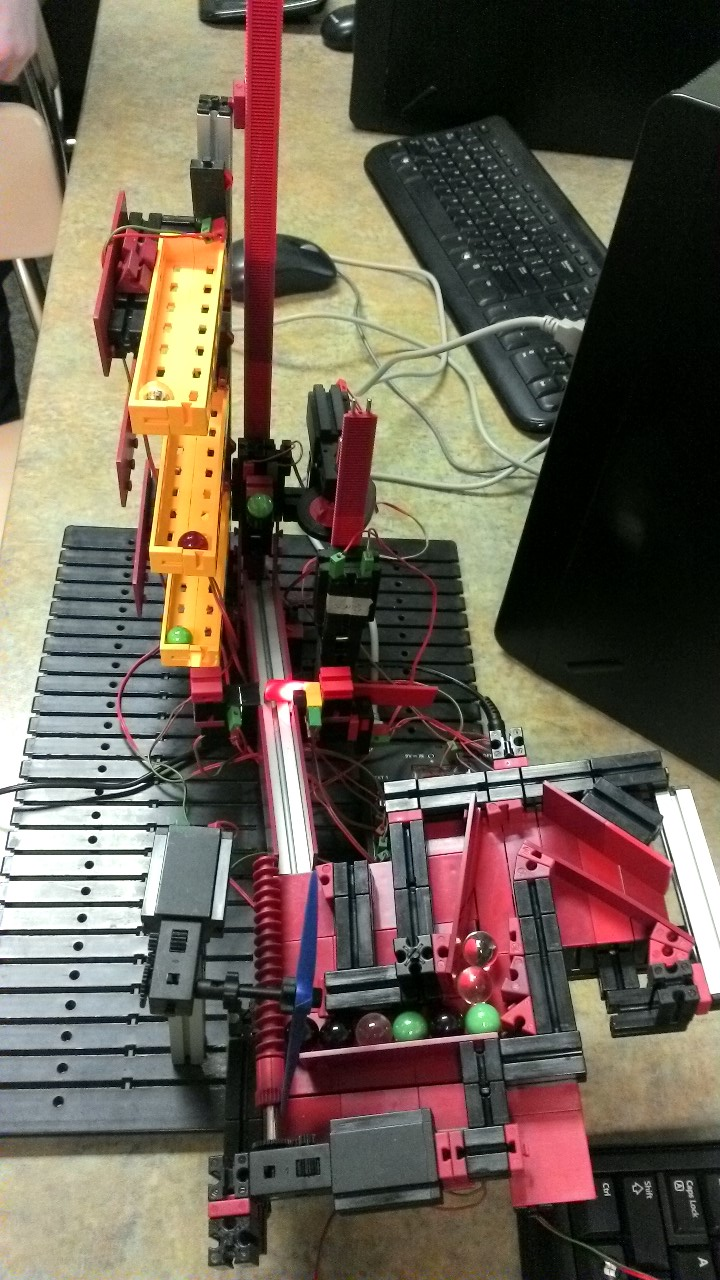
Automatic marble sorter built with Fischertechnik

=== Pretend Play ===
When a child is three years of age, their creativity will start to grow. At this age, they can take on the role of pretend play and be someone else. For example, a mom, a king, or a dinosaur. They can play with a block, and imagine it is something else, like a piece of cake. Toys that help children develop and act out what they picture in their head in important.

Pretend Play is an imaginative activity that is a vital part of childhood development, where children create scenarios, roles, and stories that are not directly rooted in reality. "Research demonstrates that developmentally appropriate play with parents and peers is a singular opportunity to promote the social-emotional, cognitive, language, and self-regulation skills that build executive function and a prosocial brain." Pretend play is important for the child's development in many fields, such as: "social and emotional skills, language skills, thinking skills, nurturing the imagination."

Many toddlers enjoy figuring out how things work. They want to be like the adults and do adult things. For example, toy kitchens, toy keys, child-sized brooms, or a vacuum cleaner. Toys like these promote problem-solving and spatial relations. They also use the muscles in their hands and fingers, which helps with motor skills.

=== Chemistry sets and science kits ===
By the 1920s and 1930s, child labor laws and other social reforms were resulting in increased numbers of children attending school. As the amount of time spent at school increased, people began to see adolescence as a distinct life stage, with its own “youth culture”. With increased urbanization and use of cars, there were new options for after-school socialization, some of which were less supervised and allowed for contact across social, class, and gender lines. Teachers and post-depression parents worried that children would get into trouble after school and began to start after-school clubs. Scientific educational toys were produced and promoted to kids as fun, and to parents as keeping kids out of trouble and encouraging them to enter well-paying careers in science. Chemcraft specifically used the slogan “Experimenter Today . . . Scientist Tomorrow” to market their chemistry sets.

Although portable chemical chests had existed as early as 1791, they were intended for use by adults, rather than children. Porter Chemical Company's Chemcraft set, marketed in 1915, was likely the first chemistry set intended for children. By 1950, Porter sold as many as 15 different chemistry sets, ranging widely in price and contents. The A. C. Gilbert Company was another leader, producing toys that promoted a wide variety of science activities. Their first chemistry sets appeared in the 1920s, and were followed by many others. Gilbert's biology toys included microscopes (e.g. the Skil Craft Biology Lab). Other companies produced biological models such as the Visible Frog Anatomy Kit and human anatomical models such as the Visible Man. In 1950, Gilbert even produced a toy targeted at potential physicists, the Gilbert U-238 Atomic Energy Laboratory, including a cloud chamber with a small amount of radioactive material. During the Cold War, marketing slogans again reveal social tensions of the time, asserting that “Porter Science Prepares Young America for World Leadership”.

Early chemistry sets included a wide range of hardware, glassware and chemicals, much of which is omitted from modern-day sets due to later concerns about possible hazards and liability. Modern chemistry kits tend to discourage free-form experimentation, containing a limited amount of specific nontoxic substances and a booklet specifying how they can be used for a specific project. Writers frequently lament that it is no longer possible for chemistry-set users to engage in the wide range of (sometimes hazardous) experimentation that attracted them to the field of chemistry as children.

Though chemistry sets lost popularity beginning in the safety-conscious 1960s, they appear to be regaining interest in the 21st century. A line of chemistry sets reminiscent of the traditional Gilbert and Porter sets was marketed as of 2012 by Thames & Kosmos. Many modern chemistry sets are designed according to the guidelines of microscale chemistry; using precise but smaller quantities of chemicals is more economical and safer than traditional setups. The related genre of forensics science toys has also become popular.

Starting in 1940, Science Service issued a series of Things of Science kits, each focused on a single topic, such as magnetism, seed germination, static electricity, or mechanical linkages. Sold only by monthly mail-order subscription, these kits consisted of a small blue cardboard box containing basic materials and detailed instructions, usually to be supplemented by commonplace household materials and objects. The wealth of knowledge and entertainment that could be derived from simple and economical materials set a standard which would later be adopted by the pioneering science and technology center, the Exploratorium in San Francisco.

Marketing of science toys has tended to be heavily gendered, with the majority of scientific toy marketing being directed to boys, with occasional exceptions. A 1921 review of Chemcraft chemistry sets stated that "These outfits are more than toys. They are miniature chemical laboratories for boys and girls... this kind of play is most interesting and amusing to every youngster". In 1921, Chemcraft advertised a "Sachetcraft" set for girls that could be used to make perfumes and cosmetics. In the 1950s, Gilbert marketed a pink "Laboratory Technician" set for girls. It contained a microscope and factory-prepared slides, rather than the raw materials to make one's own slides for viewing. However, the manual contained identical information to that given to boys.

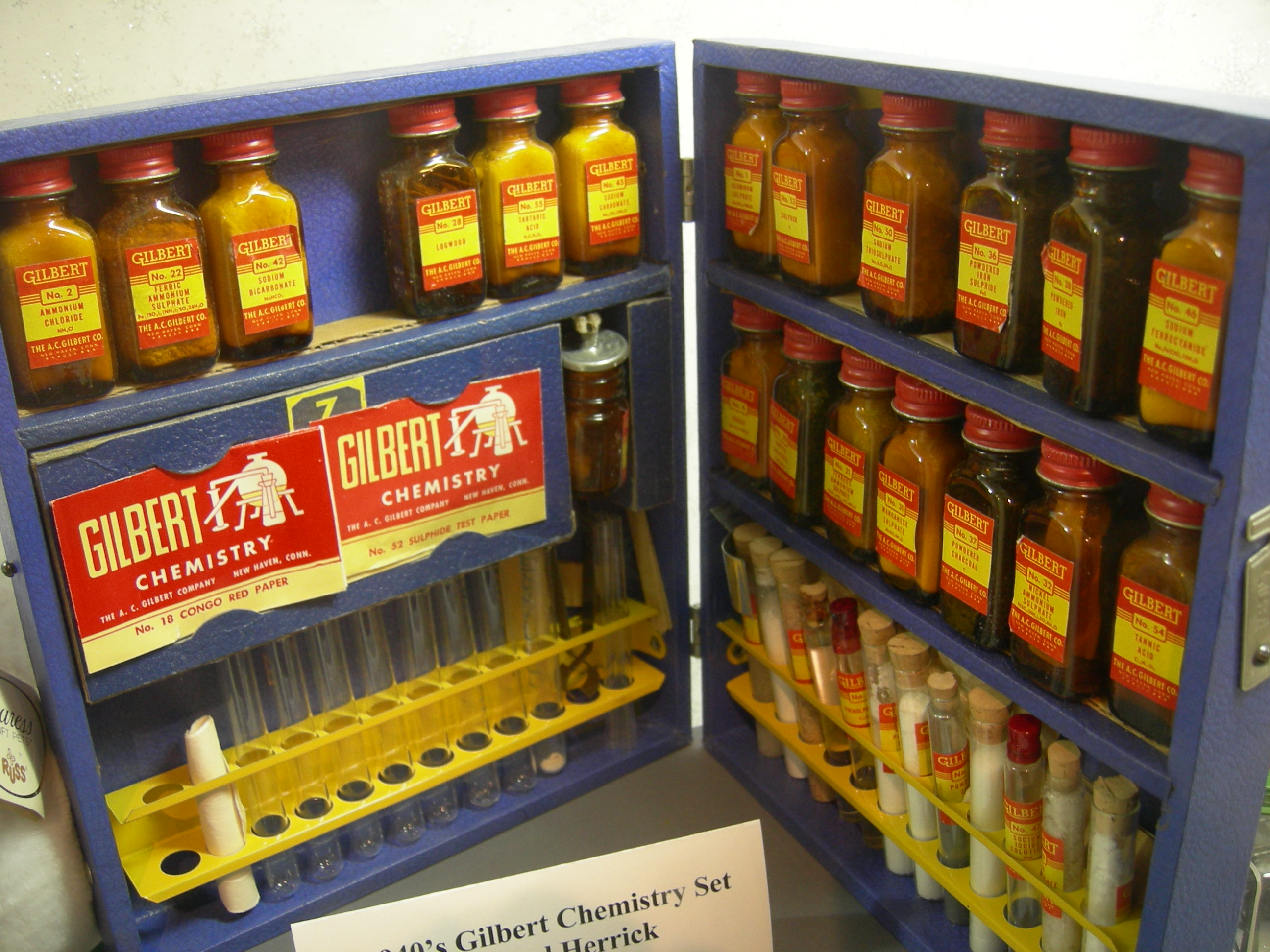
Gilbert chemistry set, c.1940

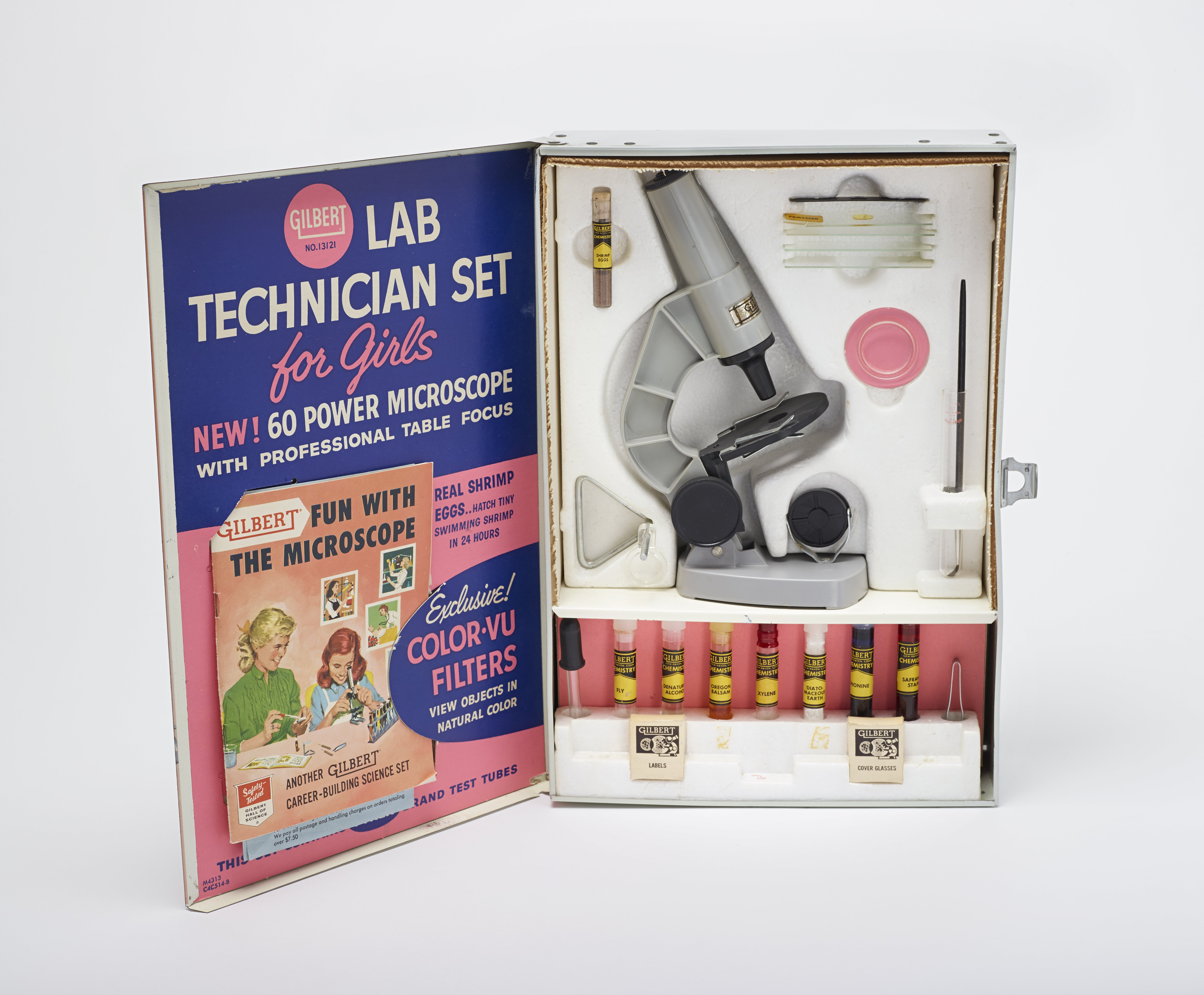
A. C. Gilbert Girl's lab technician set, 1950s

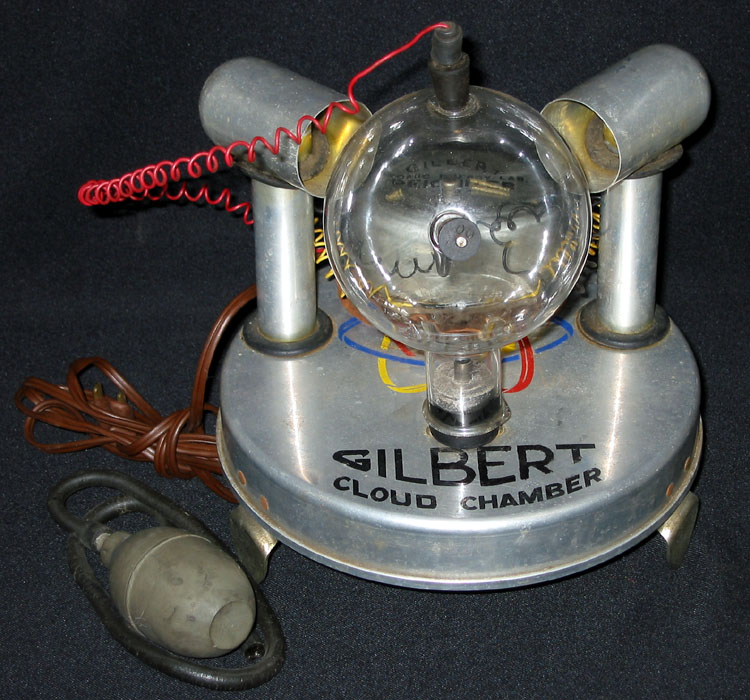
Cloud chamber, part of the Gilbert U-238 Atomic Energy Laboratory, 1950

=== Computational toys ===
As computers became more prevalent, toys were introduced to expose children to fundamental ideas in digital circuitry and their applications. Most of these toys were marketed as educational kits, with modular components that could be combined in various combinations to make interesting and entertaining creations.

A bare-bones computing model was marketed in the form of a basic analog computer, consisting of three calibrated potentiometers and a low-cost galvanometer arranged in a Wheatstone bridge circuit. This setup allowed simple computations to be performed, similar to a mechanical slide rule, but the accuracy was poor and the components could not be reconfigured in any useful way.

Around 1955, computer scientist Edmund Berkeley designed the computational toy Geniac, and in 1958 a similar toy called Brainiac. The rotary switch construction sets used combinational logic but had no memory and could not solve problems using sequential logic. Instruction booklets gave series of instructions for creating complex machines which could solve specific Boolean equations. Specific machines could play simple games like tic-tac-toe, or solve arithmetic puzzles, but the output resulted directly from the input given.

In 1961, Scientific Development Corporation introduced the Minivac 601, a simple relay-based electromechanical computer with a primitive memory, all designed by the pioneer of information theory, Claude Shannon. The expensive device attracted few buyers, and was soon upgraded and retargeted for the corporate technical training market. In 1963, E.S.R., Inc. marketed the low-cost Digi-Comp I, which allowed children to construct a simple digital computer, composed entirely of mechanical parts operated by hand. They could then play with it, watching as mechanical versions of “flip-flop” electronic circuits demonstrated Boolean logic computations, solved problems in binary logic, and calculated simple mathematical operations.

By the 1980s, expanding on the popularity of build-your-own radio and electronics kits from Radio Shack and Heathkit, it was possible to buy a kit to build your own ZX-81 microcomputer. Such projects were enthusiastically recommended as a merit badge activity for Boy Scouts. Modern-day toys have continued this trend, enabling kids to build their own circuits, machines, peripherals and computers.

The Lego company expanded into the area of robotics with its Lego Mindstorms kits, introduced in 1998. With the software and hardware provided in the kit, which includes a system controller, motors, and peripheral sensors as well as ordinary Lego building blocks, children can create programmable robots. Lego Mindstorms draws heavily on the constructionist learning theories of computer scientist and educator Seymour Papert.

More recently, Raspberry Pi is being used by teachers and students. Introduced by Eben Upton and the Raspberry Pi Foundation in the United Kingdom as an inexpensive option that would promote teaching of computer science and programming skills in lower-income schools, it has also become popular with makers and engineers.

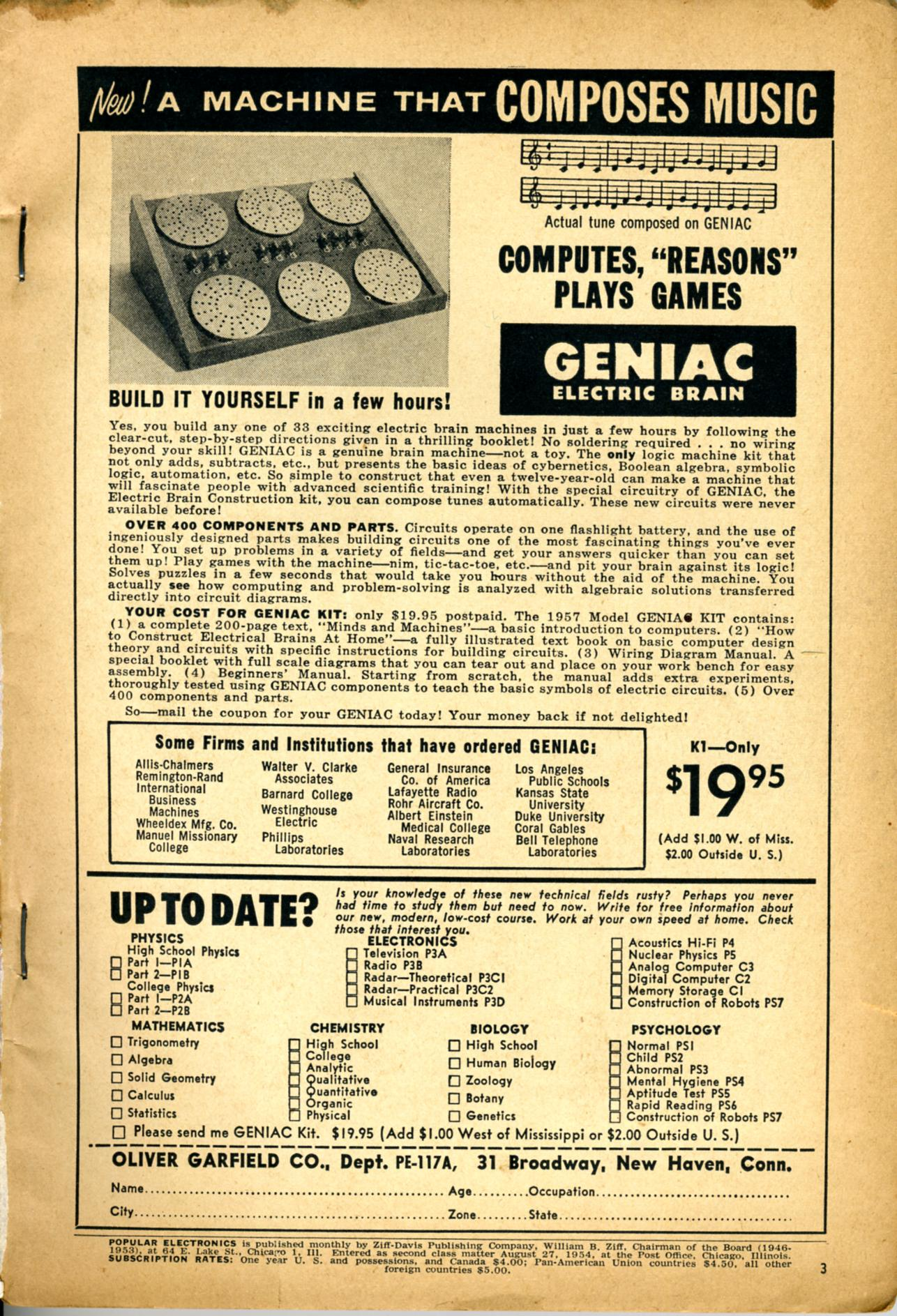
The rudimentary Geniac computer lacked any memory (1955).

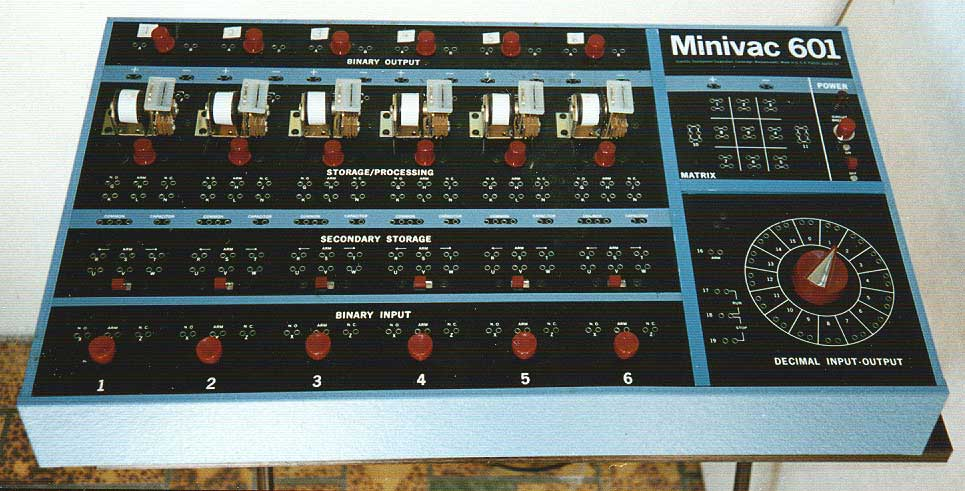
The Minivac 601 featured 6 electromechanical relays and a unique motorized display (1961).

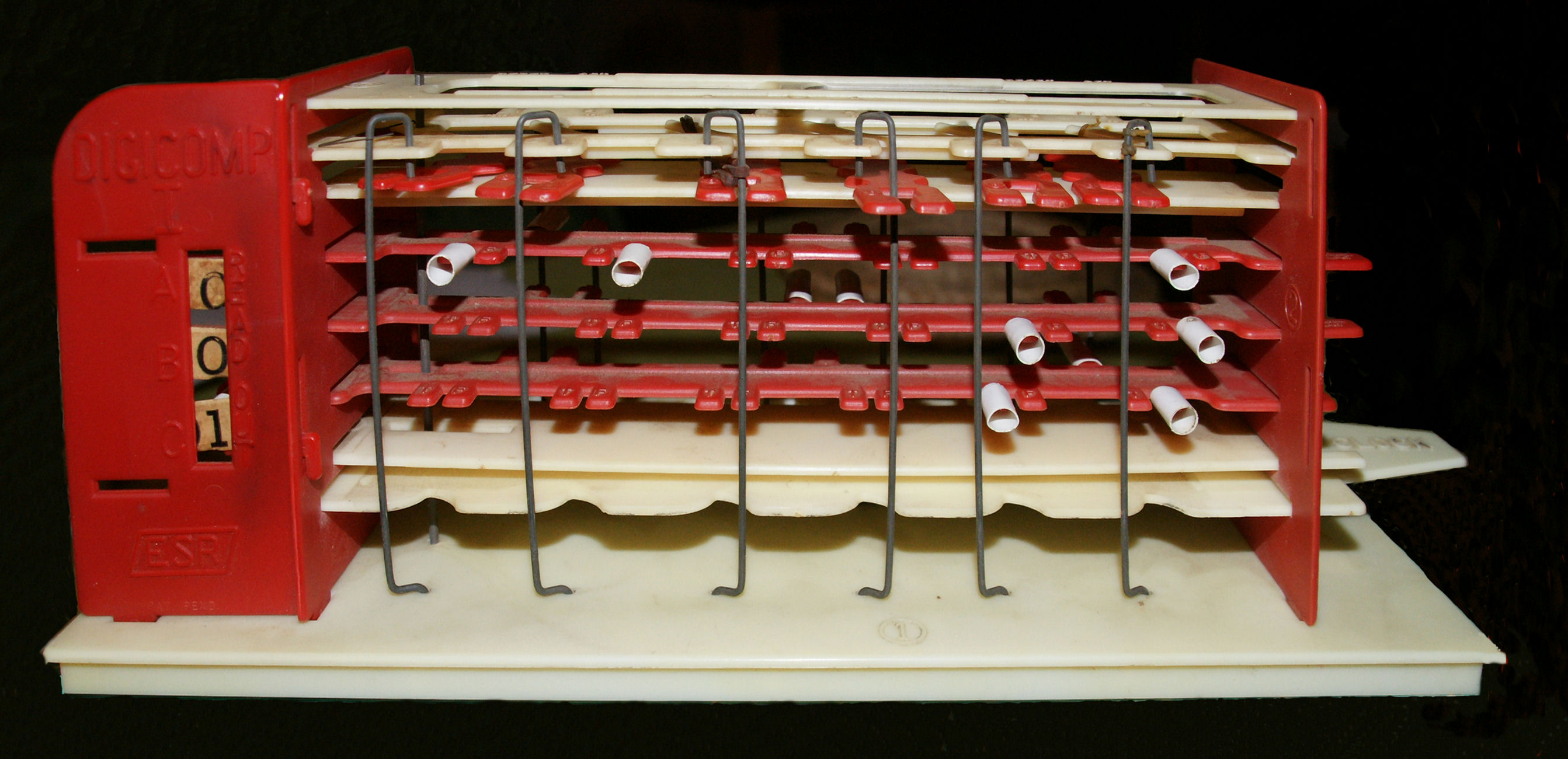
The Digi-Comp I digital mechanical computer (1963)

=== Toy computers ===
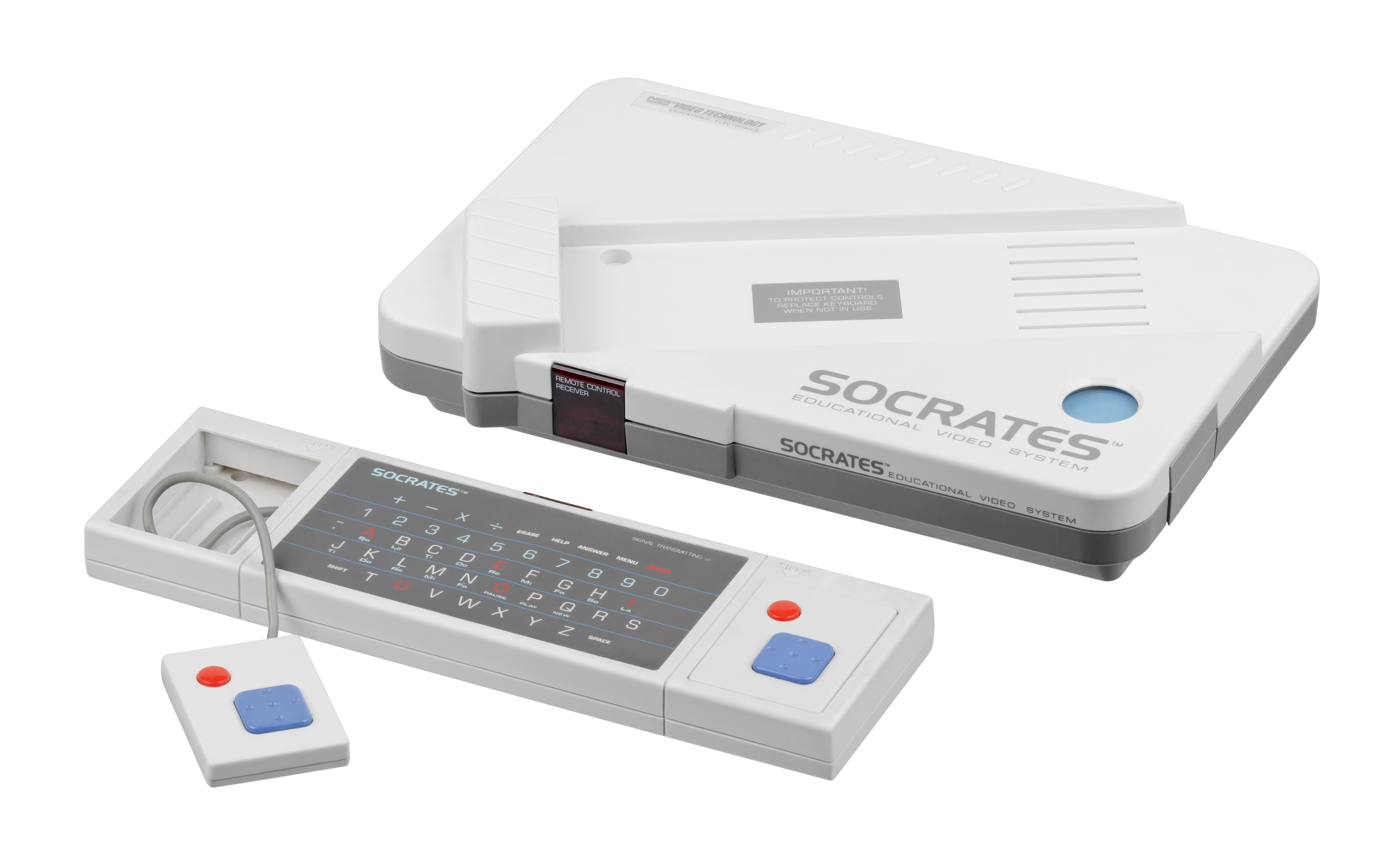
Simple computers and game consoles that focused on children's learning started appearing in the 1980s, like this VTech Socrates from 1988.

Toys are typically categized as a physical object. There are pretend toys that symbolize real life like cars, dolls, cooking and feeding implements. There are fine motive toys like blocks, shapes, and puzzles. There are also art toys, language toys, and gross motor toys that improve physical interaction. Over the past two decades, many traditional toys have been adapted into electronic versions and eliminate that human connection. For example a toy bear that is electronic and reads a story to a child.

Toys that match a child's developmental skills is key. Data is in support of children playing with toys with their caregiver, and not alone. If a caregiver is engaged it is likely that new language is being used, there are verbal interactions, and a child's focus is building.

In 2013, a study was completed to show how much technology children were having access to. The studied stated that 38% of children younger than two and 80% of two-four year old children had used a mobile electronic device. That evidence was doubled from 2011. By 2023, 73.34% of children used a mobile phone, and this usage continues to increase with age.

Some manufacturers regarded standard personal computers as an inappropriate platform for learning software for younger children, and produced custom child-friendly pieces of hardware instead. The hardware and software are generally combined into a single product, such as a laptop-lookalike. Such computers may be custom-designed standalone toys, or personal computers tailored for children's use.

Common examples include imaginatively designed handheld game consoles with a variety of pluggable educational game cartridges and book-like electronic devices into which a variety of electronic books can be loaded. These products are more portable than general laptop computers, but have a much more limited range of purposes, concentrating on literacy and numeracy.

Screentime reduces and interferes with play time. Many caregivers do not even have input with what their child is watching or doing on these devices. Yes, there has been research done that there are learning benefits to interactive media. One example that was popular in the early 2000's was the LeapFrog.

The LeapFrog was launched in 1999 as a literacy tool used for children. The product, the LeapPad was a computer like book reader. At home, or in a classroom children could touch a letter, word, or sentence and have the content read to them. The Leapad focused on engagement, the books and games used were meant to spark curiosity and growth. "Beat-the-clock" and "hide-and-seek" were games offered while reading to incorporate traditional child's play, with learning development.

On the other side, electronic media and the exposure of too much have it has been seen to increase violent behavior and desensitize children to consequences. Children who use their hands and physically play are exploring areas in their brain like spatial and mathematical learning.

Ergonomic hardware is fundamental for baby learning, where tablet computers and touchscreens are preferably used instead of keyboards and computer mice. Also, a sandbox environment is created, to disable the use of the keyboard (excepting some combination of keys that can only be typed by an adult), taskbar, and opening of other programs and screens. Child computer keyboards may use large and differently colored keys to help differentiate them. Baby and toddler computers include ABC keyboards. Some child computers include QWERTY keyboards as an early aid in learning typing. Small mice, about half the size of a typical adult mouse, or large trackballs are used in toddler's computers. They are programmed for “one-click” operation. The case may be reinforced to protect it from misadventure. Such computers are not seen as a replacement for time spent parenting.[5]

== Educational theories and play ==
Sometimes described as "the work of children", child's play can be viewed as the process through which children experience the world, practicing and internalizing new skills and ideas. Experiences include imitation, reasoning about cause and effect, solving problems, and engaging in symbolic thinking." As children grow and learn, the repertoire of skills which they are developmentally ready to acquire expands, building upon previous knowledge. The progress of early development is enhanced by play from 33% to 67%. Language, and reducing both social and emotional problems are all major areas that are improved by play. Play is important for children's cognitive, emotional, and social development.

There are also other benefits to play. The physical benefits of play allow for children to have an increase of efficiency in their immune, endocrine, and cardiovascular systems. In America, obesity is a problem, and play could be a part of the solution.

Energy-burning play can help kids stay fit and burn off excess calories. Fatigue, muscle strain, inability to enter tight spaces, can all be negative effects of children being overweight. Kids need to run around, play outside, and exercise their bodies. In recent years, there has also been research done over reducing ADHD. Attention deficit hyperactivity disorder is when a person can not focus on more than one task. In 2022, 1 million children ages 3–17 years old in the U.S. were diagnosed with ADHD.

Many children do not meet the recommended levels for play each day. With growing levels of screen time, levels of active play are declining. There is no doubt that children can become bored and lose focus in a classroom setting. Active play can help children’s motivation and increase their focus.

Teachers who use educational toys in classroom settings try to identify toys that will be appropriate to a child's developmental level, existing skills, and interests. They try to engage children with toys in ways that support cognitive development. Many educators emphasize the importance of open-ended imaginative play, exploration and social engagement. Toys with the quality of open-endedness can be used by children in a variety of ways and at different ages and developmental levels. Educational toys vary widely in terms of their open-endedness and their potential for exploration, imaginative play, and social engagement. Play theorist Brian Sutton Smith, who advocates for free play, has asserted that "the plans of the playful imagination dominate the objects or the toys, not the other way around." Toys whose design is more heavily specified and restricted may be less intuitive for children to use, and require more engagement and support from adults. Many studies of educational toys report that the effectiveness of a toy is more related to the involvement and guidance of adults, or to the child's intellectual level, than to the toy itself.

Educational toys claim to enhance intellectual, social, emotional, and/or physical development. Educational toys are thus designed to target development milestones within appropriate age groups. For preschool age youngsters, simple wooden blocks might be a good starting point for a child to begin to understand causal relationships, basic principles of science (e.g. if a block falls from the top of a structure, it will fall until a surface stops its fall), and develop patience and rudimentary hand–eye coordination. For a child moving towards elementary school, other, more sophisticated manipulatives might further aid the development of these skills. Interlocking manipulative toys like Lego or puzzles challenge the child to improve hand–eye coordination, patience, and an understanding of spatial relationships. Finally, a child in elementary school might use very sophisticated construction sets that include moving parts, motors and others to help further understand the complex workings of the world. Importantly, the educational value derived by the child increases when the educational toy is age appropriate.

== Measuring educational effectiveness ==
Studies that examine the usefulness of manipulatives have found that outcomes may vary widely depending on physical characteristics of the materials themselves and the ways in which they are used. Emphasis is often placed on the importance of the physicality of the manipulative, but some work on teaching geometry concepts suggests that manipulability and meaningfulness are more important than physicality. Students who used a Logo computer program that required them to consider their actions carefully learned more than students who learned from textbooks, and retained that knowledge longer than students who used physical manipulatives.

== Toys that grow ==
Children need toys that will grow with them. Buying toys that a child plays with for a few days and throws away means it is not helping with their development. Toys need to be engaging and challenge the child as they get older. For example if a toddler plays with plastic toy animals, as they get older they can build a barn out of cardboard and other craft supplies. The toys grow with the child, and they further their understanding.

== Marketing ==
Toys are big business: the global toy market is estimated at over 80 billion US dollars annually. In 2013 the average household in the United Kingdom spent the equivalent of $438 US per child on toys, while US families spent $336 per child. In advertising, "educational toys" are sometimes differentiated from "promotional" toys, which are marketed primarily as part of a group of related products (e.g. American Girl dolls, Transformers, Steven Universe toys). It is also possible for these categories to overlap (e.g. Star Wars Legos).

When it comes to toys, advertising plays a huge role. In 2025, traditional toys and new media toys are used. The media often portrays media toys as crucial for children, targeting the parents. However, this marketing style has led to the increase of enrichment videos, computer programs, recorded books, and access to this all at infancy.

However, some toys support development more than others. Good toys do not have to be expensive but will encourage imagination, and improve social-emotional and cognitive skills.

The term "educational toy" is often applied in toy advertising to promote sales to parents. The packaging of many toys includes a table of skills and benefits asserted to be enhanced by use of the product. The actual developmental benefit of these, by comparison to a cheaper, simpler or more easily available product, is often unproven. In many cases homemade educational toys may be just as effective as expensive purchased ones, as long as developmental issues are understood.

== Examples ==
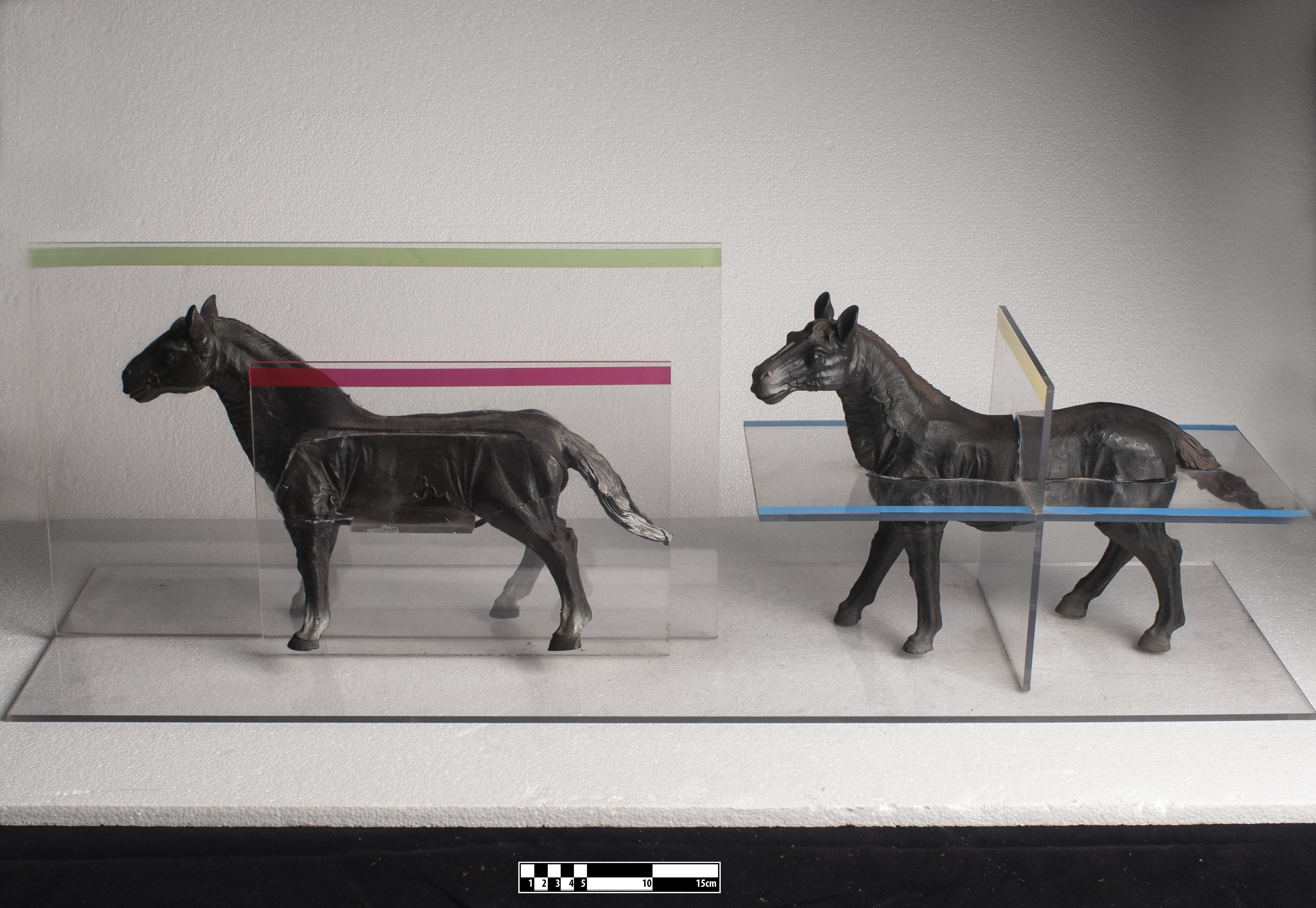
Didactic model of anatomical planes

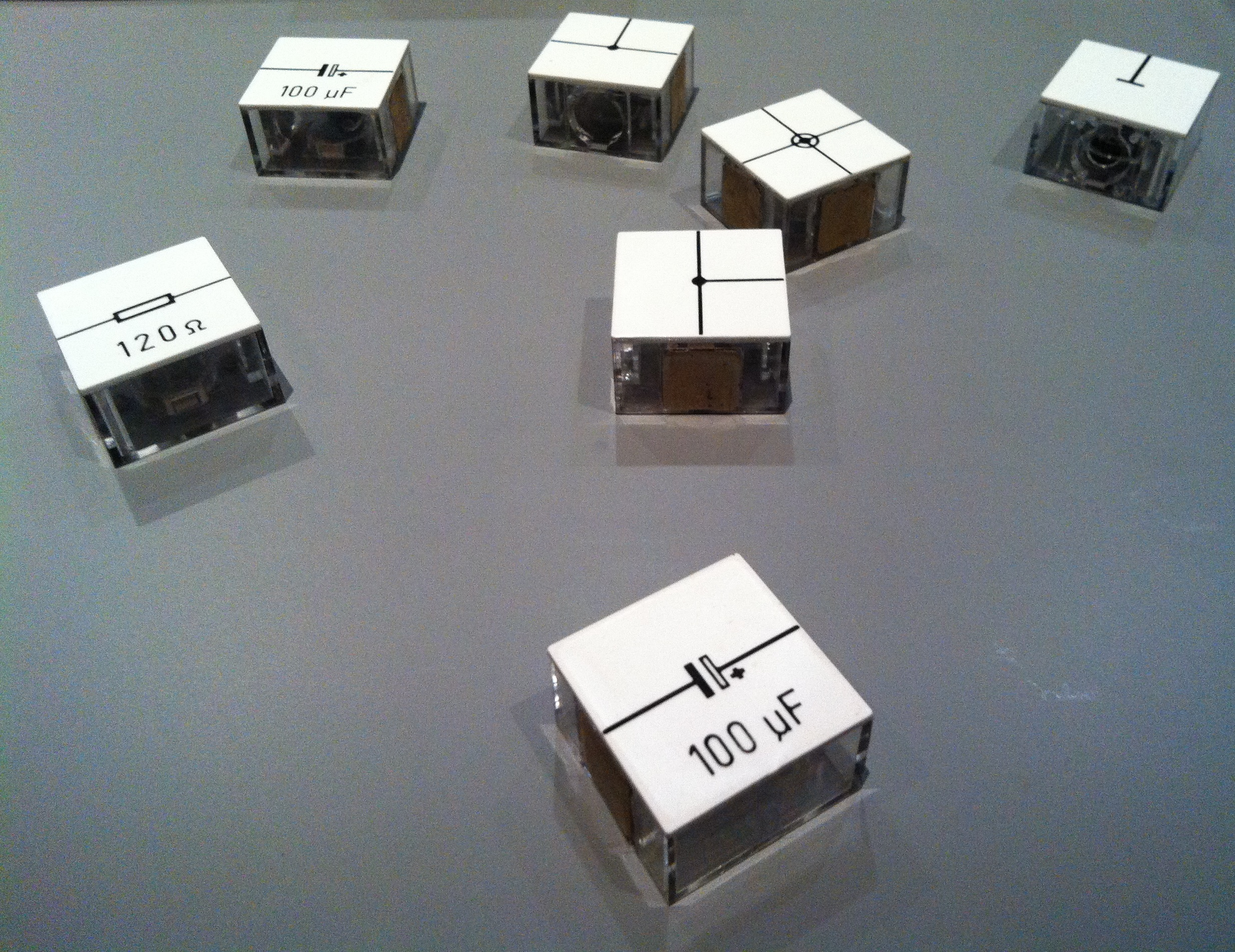
Braun Lectron designed by Dieter Rams and Jürgen Greubel (1967)

Examples of educational toys include:

- Building toys, such as toy blocks
  - Automoblox wooden construction cars
  - Scale models
- Chemistry sets
- Construction toys
  - Erector Set
  - Lego
  - Meccano
- Electronic toys (see also: Electronic kit)
  - Lectron electronic blocks
  - Speak & Spell, Speak & Read, and Speak & Math
  - Snap Circuits
  - Many VTech and LeapFrog products
- Microscopes
  - Skil Craft Biology Lab, 1960s
- Models of real objects
  - Model aircraft
  - Model railroads
  - Model cars and other vehicles
  - Model animals, e.g. Carnegie collection
  - Model microbes, e.g. GIANTmicrobes
  - Playmobil model scenes
- Musical instruments
  - Toy piano
- Physics
  - Euler's Disk
  - Galilean cannon
  - Newton's cradle
  - Rattleback
  - Tippe top
  - Hoberman sphere
- Robots and robot kits
  - 2-XL and Kasey the Kinderbot
  - Botley the Coding Robot
  - Lego Mindstorms
  - Qfix robot kit
  - Puzzles
- Learning tools
  - Tutor Systems
- Science kits
  - Science Kit and Boreal Laboratories
  - Thames & Kosmos
  - Flintobox

== See also ==
- Constructionism (learning theory)
- Education
- Educational entertainment
- Educational game
- Educational software
- Parenting styles
- Puzzle
- Toy advertising
