= MyFamilyBuilders =

Educational toy company

- Type: Private
- Industry: Toys
- Genre: Educational toys
- Founded: 2015; 11 years ago
- Founder: Ezequiel Karpf
- Headquarters: United States
- Products: Magnetic wooden figure sets
- Website: myfamilybuilders.com

MyFamilyBuilders is a United States-based educational toy company that produces magnetic wooden figure sets designed to allow children to assemble human characters from interchangeable parts. The company was founded in 2015 by toy designer Ezequiel Karpf and launched its first product through a Kickstarter crowdfunding campaign that year. The company's products are designed around the premise that children should be able to construct characters and family groups that reflect a range of skin tones, ages, and family compositions.

== History ==
MyFamilyBuilders was founded in 2015 by Ezequiel Karpf, a toy designer who observed that the majority of mass-market doll and figure sets depicted a narrow range of family configurations and racial representations. In August 2015, the company launched its first product through a Kickstarter crowdfunding campaign with a stated funding goal of US$25,000. The campaign received coverage in The Washington Post, The Huffington Post, the Chicago Tribune, CNN Money, and the trade publication The Toy Insider.

Following the Kickstarter campaign, the company expanded distribution to direct-to-consumer retail through its own website and through online marketplaces, and to wholesale channels serving early childhood education suppliers.

== Products ==
MyFamilyBuilders' product line consists of magnetic wooden figure sets in which the heads, torsos, and legs of figures can be detached and recombined. The pieces are produced in four skin tones and include both adult and child figures, allowing children to assemble characters intended to represent single-parent, blended, multiracial, and same-sex parent family groupings.

The company's flagship 48-piece set, introduced through the 2015 Kickstarter campaign, includes interchangeable wooden pieces and 25 activity cards used in a set of structured games. According to the manufacturer, the pieces can be combined into more than 2,000 configurations. The company has subsequently introduced smaller sets, including a 32-piece variant containing adult and child figures and a 16-piece "Friends" set containing only child figures.

== Recognition ==
In 2016, the 48-piece MyFamilyBuilders set received the Gold Award from the Parents' Choice Foundation.

In 2021, MyFamilyBuilders was named one of sixteen United States small-business recipients of a US$10,000 Innovation Grant through Amazon Launchpad's Innovation Awards program. All sixteen 2021 grant recipients were eligible for the program's "Innovator of the Year" designation, which was awarded that year to a different recipient.
