= Tutor (disambiguation) =

A tutor is somebody who helps teach another.

Tutor or TUTOR may also refer to:

== Aviation ==
- Avro Tutor
- Canadair CT-114 Tutor
- Slingsby Kirby Tutor
- Slingsby Motor Tutor
- Timm N2T Tutor

== Computing ==
- TUTOR, a programming language
- Tomy Tutor, a home computer

== Fiction ==
- The Tutor, a play by Jakob Michael Reinhold Lenz
  - The Tutor (Brecht), an adaptation of that play by Bertolt Brecht
- The Tutor (film), a 2023 American thriller film

== People ==
- Gaius Vellaeus Tutor, ancient Roman senator
- Glennray Tutor (born 1950), American painter
- Ronald Tutor (born 1940/1941), American businessman
- Tracy Tutor (born 1975), American real estate agent and reality television personality

== Other uses ==
- Tutor (education), an officer in the British university system
- Tutor.com, an online tutoring company
- Tutor Systems, an educational game

== See also ==
- Tudor (disambiguation)
