= Imhotep (board game) =

Strategy board game

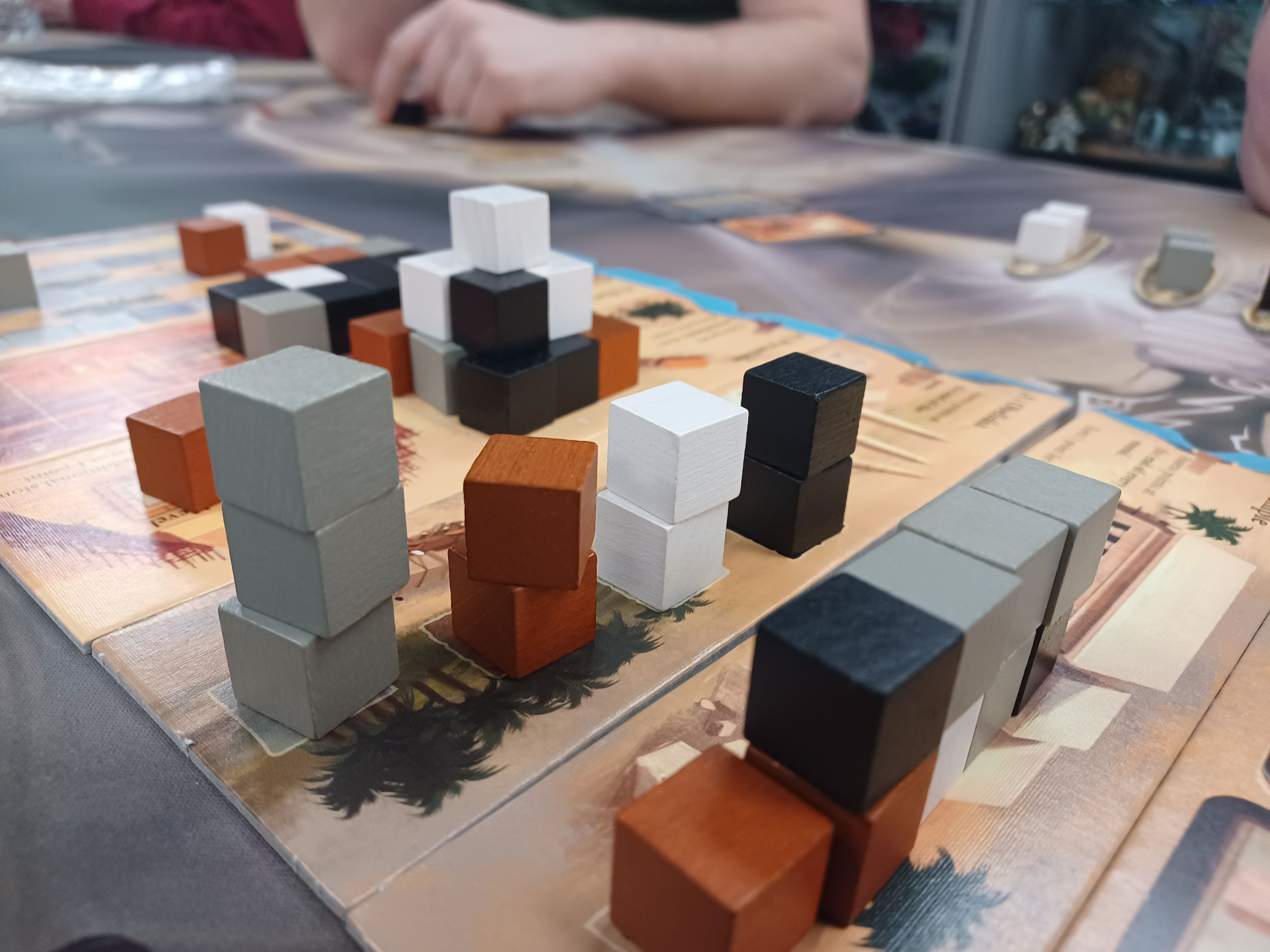
- Stacked stones at various sites
- Designers: Phil Walker-Harding
- Publishers: Thames & Kosmos
- Publication: 2016; 10 years ago
- Genres: Family game
- Players: 2–4
- Playing time: 40 minutes
- Age range: 10+

Imhotep is a board game designed by Phil Walker-Harding and published in 2016 by Thames & Kosmos.

== Gameplay ==
The game consists of two to four players who assume the role of a master builder in ancient Egypt, each taking turns every round over the course of six rounds to construct monuments (burial chamber, obelisk, pyramid, or temple). Players accumulate victory points, which are tallied after six rounds to determine a winner.

On their turn, a player takes one action from the available choices: quarrying 3 stones, loading a stone onto a boat, dispatching a loaded boat to one of five destinations, or executing an action from a previously obtained Market card. Boats differ in size, with capacities ranging from one to four stones, and the types of boat available changes every round. The stones may be loaded to any position by any player, but are unloaded from front to back at their destination. A round ends when all boats have sailed to a destination.

Docking a boat at a pyramid site results in stones being used to construct a "three-level cube pyramid" and scoring victory points immediately. Temples are scored by viewing the structures from above, along a five-stone track, at the end of each round. Burial chambers and obelisks are scored at the end of the six rounds, the former based on the number of connected stones and the latter on height.

At the fifth site, players acquire one Market card for each stone delivered. These grant the player an additional action in a future round, enable the placement of a stone in one of the structures, or provide a scoring bonus.

== Expansion ==
In 2018, Thames & Kosmos published Imhotep: A New Dynasty expansion for the base game, which included new Market cards and more monument sites, resulting in gameplay lasting about an additional 10 minutes.

== Reception ==
It was nominated for the 2016 Spiel des Jahres award, and ranked second in the 2016 Golden Geek Award for family games published that year, behind Codenames: Pictures.

GameInformer reviewer Matt Miller stated that Imhotep is an "elegant and intricately balanced" game with "accessible play", rating it one of the top tabletop games published in 2016.

In a review for TechRaptor, Travis Williams states that the game is fast-paced, easy to teach and learn, and designed for "gamers who enjoy friendly competitions over direct confrontations". He states that a game with four players is optimal, as "it is simply more interesting to play when more people are competing in the same space".

Nate Anderson and Aaron Zimmerman state in a review for Ars Technica that the game is "extremely tight throughout" and can be chaotic and "extremely mean". They also state it may not be appropriate for some young children or for players who "prefer to be in full control of their game-long strategic planning".

In a review for The Toy Insider, Malanie Rainone states that Imhotep "would make a great addition to any brainy family game night".
