= Kasey the Kinderbot =

Educational toy learning system by Fisher-Price

- Type: Educational toy
- Invented by: Michael J. Freeman
- Company: Fisher-Price
- Country: US
- Availability: 2002–2006
- Official website

Kasey the Kinderbot is an educational toy learning system designed, developed, and sold by Fisher-Price, a wholly owned division of the Mattel Corporation, nominated for the Educational Toy of the Year award in 2002. Because of its strong commercial sales, Kasey was reported as an important item in the balance sheet of Fisher-Price.

Fisher-Price marketed Kasey the Kinderbot (robot) as able to teach 40 skills required for pre-school-readiness and built learning skills by teaching kids to look at things in new ways.

== History ==
In 2002 Fisher-Price introduced the Kasey the Kinderbot (pictured center, voiced by Kamala Kruszka) Educational line of toys that was capable of teaching 40 learning skills to pre-schoolers including basic math, reading, and science. Kasey has moving eyes, head, waist, arms and hands all of which are coordinated to its voice and LCD. According to Fisher-Price Kasey incorporated the use of a special learning circuit for reinforcement and education.

In 2004, Fetch the Phonicsbot (voiced by Kath Soucie) was introduced for phonetics education, and Toby the Totbot (voiced by Kate Higgins) was introduced for younger children.

When initially introduced in 2002 Kasey had 8 programs planned. These were released over a period of 18 months starting mid-2002 till December 2003.

Kasey is an updated version of the 2-XL Robot both within the "smart toy" genre.

In start, Kasey had a smaller number of programs as compared to 2-XL as they were more complex to develop. Where 2-XL programs only had to coordinate audio tracks for each button response, the programs for Kasey had to coordinate the Kasey voice with respective button responses in addition to the lights, movement, the LCD screen animation and menus, etc.

These programs are color-coded as per their category. These include, red for Languages, green for Science, blue for Math and yellow for Reading. Introductory cartridge that is included with Kasey labeled "Kasey the Kinderbot" is purple. The introductory program stored directly in Kasey. This allows Kasey to go to the default program as the introductory one in case the cartridge slot is left empty.

Kasey teaches forty different learning skills. The line was expanded in 2004 with the introduction of Fetch to concentrate on teaching phonics, and Toby to educate younger children. Both toys expanded the Kasey the Kinderbot line and had lower price points. Kasey was reported as an important item in the balance sheet of Fisher-Price because of its strong commercial sales.

Kasey was based on an interactive robot concept licensed from American educator, CEO and inventor Michael J. Freeman, who was the founder, chairman, and chief executive officer (CEO) of ACTV Inc.

Kasey the Kinderbot won the Oppenheim Gold Seal award for 2003, Best Toys of 2002 from Parents Magazine, Best of 2002 from Nick Jr. Magazine, among other awards and recognitions.

== Educational programs ==
The Kasey educational programs were digital cartridges:

- Languages: French (2002)
- Languages: Spanish (2002)
- Math: Addition & More (2003)
- Math: Numbers & Counting (2003)
- Reading: Focus on Phonics (2003)
- Reading: Words & Sentences (2003)
- Science: Living Things (2002)
- Science: Wonderful World (2002)

== See also ==
- 2-XL
- Mego Corporation
- Tiger Electronics
