= Gilbert U-238 Atomic Energy Laboratory =

Radioactive toy lab set

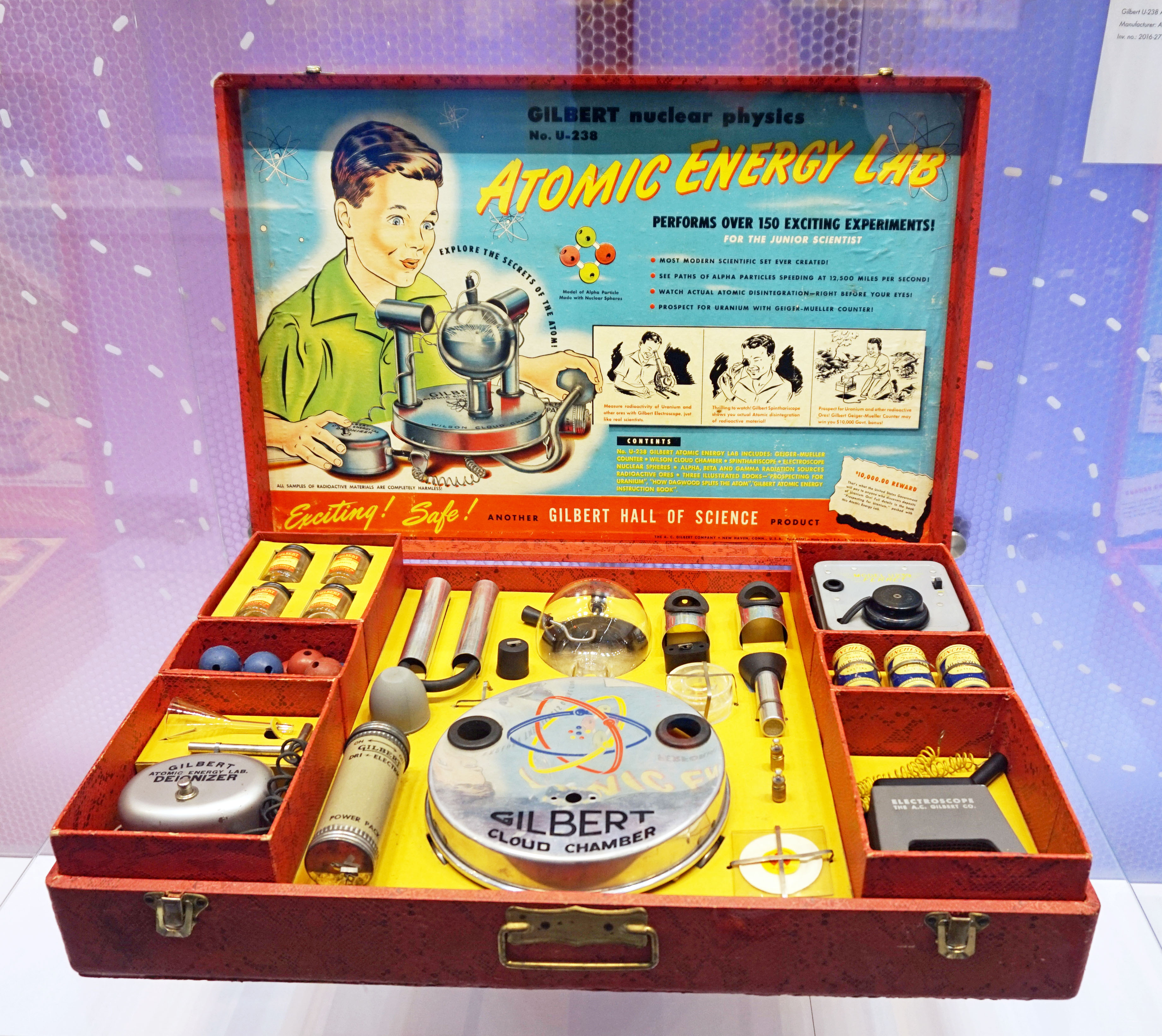
The Gilbert U-238 Atomic Energy Laboratory was packaged in a customized metal case

The Gilbert U-238 Atomic Energy Lab is a toy lab set designed to allow children to create and watch nuclear and chemical reactions using radioactive material. The Atomic Energy Lab was released by the A. C. Gilbert Company in 1950.

== Background and development ==
The kit was created by Alfred Carlton Gilbert, who was an American athlete, magician, toy-maker, businessman, and inventor of the well-known Erector Set. Gilbert believed that toys were the foundation in building a "solid American character", and many of his toys had some type of educational significance to them. Gilbert was even dubbed "the man who saved Christmas" during World War I when he convinced the US Council of National Defense not to ban toy purchases during Christmas time.

The Atomic Energy Lab was just one of a dozen chemical reactions lab kits on the market at the time. Gilbert’s toys often included instructions on how the child could use the set to put on his own "magic show". For parents, he pushed the idea that the sets' use of chemical reactions directed their children toward a potential career in science and engineering.

In 1954, Gilbert wrote in his autobiography, The Man Who Lives in Paradise, that the Atomic Energy Laboratory was "the most spectacular of [their] new educational toys". Gilbert wrote that the government encouraged the set's development because it believed the lab would aid public understanding of atomic energy and emphasize its constructive aspects. Gilbert also defended his Atomic Energy Laboratory, stating it was safe and accurate and that some of the country's best nuclear physicists had worked on the project.

== Description ==
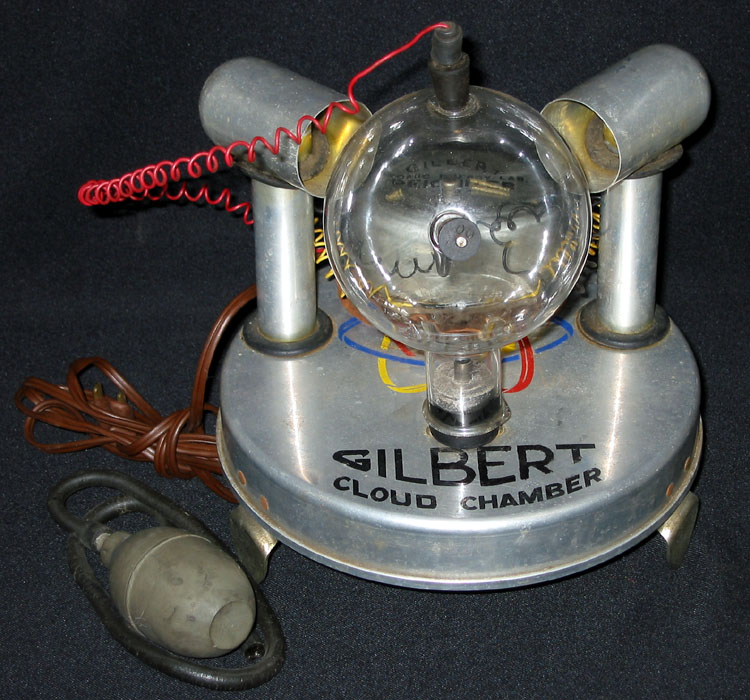
Gilbert cloud chamber, assembled

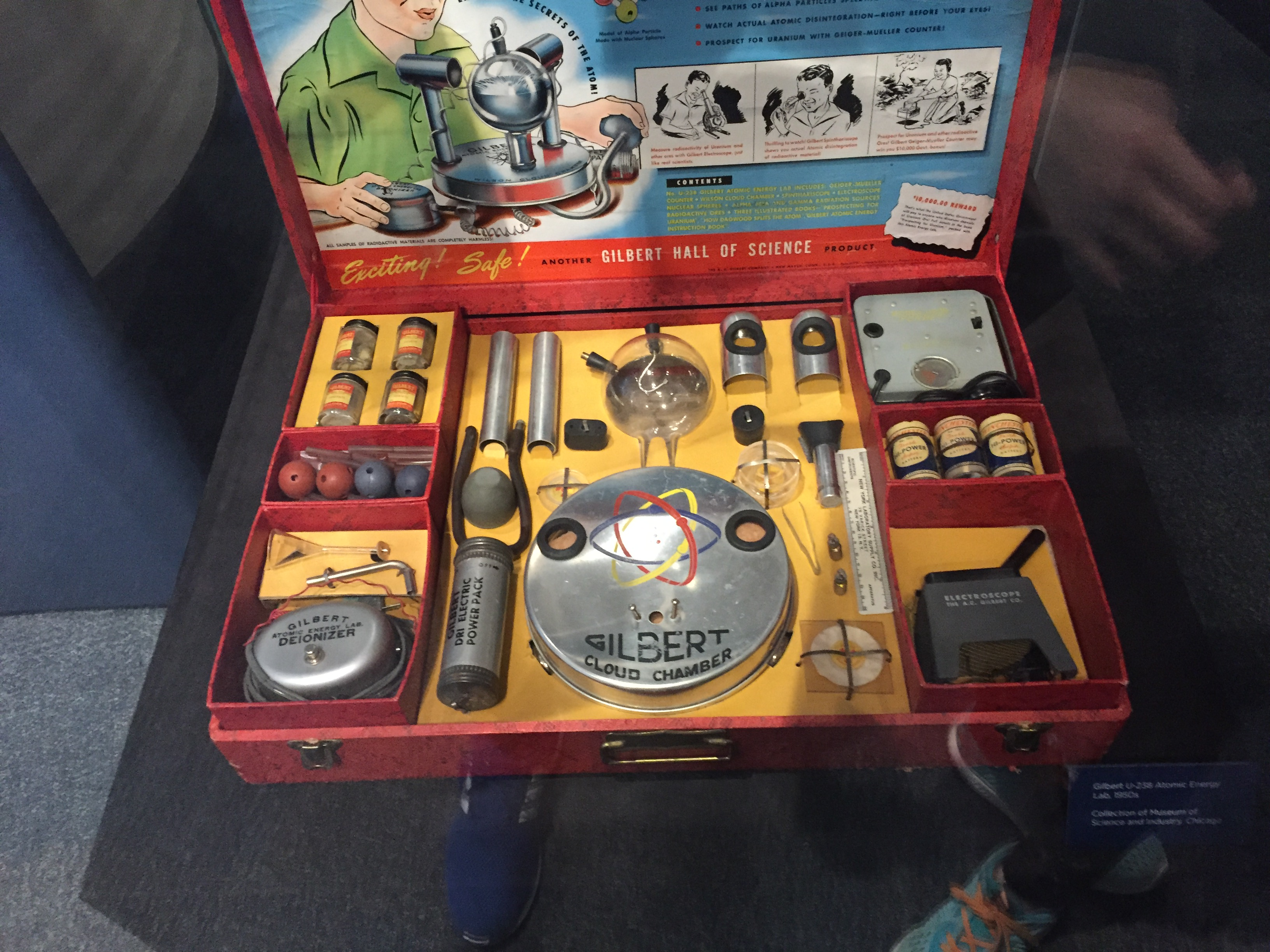
An alternative view of kit contents

The lab contained a cloud chamber allowing the viewer to watch alpha particles traveling at 12,000 miles per second (19,000,000 m/s), a spinthariscope showing the results of radioactive disintegration on a fluorescent screen, and an electroscope measuring the radioactivity of different substances in the set.

Gilbert's original promotions claimed that none of the materials could prove dangerous. The instructions encouraged laboratory cleanliness by cautioning users not to break the seals on three of the ore sample jars, for "they tend to flake and crumble and you would run the risk of having radioactive ore spread out in your laboratory. This will raise the level of the background count", thus impairing the results of experiments by distorting the performance of the Geiger counter.

The Gilbert catalog copy included the reassurance that "All radioactive materials included with the Atomic Energy Lab have been certified as completely safe by Oak-Ridge Laboratories, part of the Atomic Energy Commission."

The set originally sold for $49.50 (equivalent to $650 in 2024) and contained the following:

- Battery-powered Geiger–Müller counter
- Electroscope
- Spinthariscope
- Wilson cloud chamber with short-lived alpha source (Po-210) in the form of a wire
- Four glass jars containing natural uranium-bearing (U-238) ore samples (autunite, torbernite, uraninite, and carnotite from the "Colorado plateau region")
- Low-level radiation sources:
  - beta-alpha (Pb-210)
  - pure beta (possibly Ru-106)
  - gamma (Zn-65)
- "Nuclear spheres" for making a model of an alpha particle
- Gilbert Atomic Energy Manual — a 60-page instruction book written by Dr. Ralph E. Lapp
- Learn How Dagwood Split the Atom — comic book introduction to radioactivity, written with the help of General Leslie Groves (director of the Manhattan Project) and John R. Dunning (a physicist who verified fission of the uranium atom)
- Prospecting for Uranium — a 1949 book published jointly by the Atomic Energy Commission and the United States Geological Survey
- Three C batteries
- 1951 Gilbert Toys catalog

A product catalog described the set as follows: "Produces awe-inspiring sights! Enables you to actually SEE the paths of electrons and alpha particles traveling at speeds of more than 10,000 miles per SECOND! Electrons racing at fantastic velocities produce delicate, intricate paths of electrical condensation – beautiful to watch. Viewing Cloud Chamber action is closest man has come to watching the Atom! Assembly kit (Chamber can be put together in a few minutes) includes Dri-Electric Power Pack, Deionizer, Compression Bulb, Glass Viewing Chamber, Tubings, Power Leads, Stand, and Legs."

Among other activities, the kit suggested "playing hide and seek with the gamma ray source", challenging players to use the Geiger counter to locate a radioactive sample hidden in a room.

== Criticism ==
In 2006, the pop culture publication Radar Magazine called the lab set one of "the 10 most dangerous toys of all time, ... exclud[ing] BB guns, slingshots, throwing stars, and anything else actually intended to inflict harm", because of the radioactive material it included (it was number 2 on the list; number 1 was lawn darts).

The professional journal IEEE Spectrum published a more-detailed review in 2020, discussing the kit in the context of the history of science education kits and safety concerns. It described the likely radiation exposure as "minimal, about the equivalent to a day’s UV exposure from the sun", provided that the radioactive samples were not removed from their containers, in compliance with the warnings in the kit instructions.

The Bulletin of the Atomic Scientists published a brief article on the web, which featured Voula Saridakis, a curator at the Museum of Science and Industry (Chicago) hosting a detailed video tour of the Atomic Energy Lab components. She concluded by saying that the kit failed to sell because of its high price, and not due to any safety concerns at the time.

== Legacy ==
Unlike A.C. Gilbert's chemistry sets, the Atomic Energy Lab was never popular and was soon taken off the shelves. Fewer than 5,000 kits were sold, and the product was only offered in 1950 and 1951. Gilbert believed the Atomic Energy Lab was commercially unsuccessful because the lab was more appropriate for those who had some educational background rather than the A.C. Gilbert Company's younger typical target audience. Columbia University purchased five of these sets for their physics lab.
