= Minivac 601 =

Electromechanical computer system

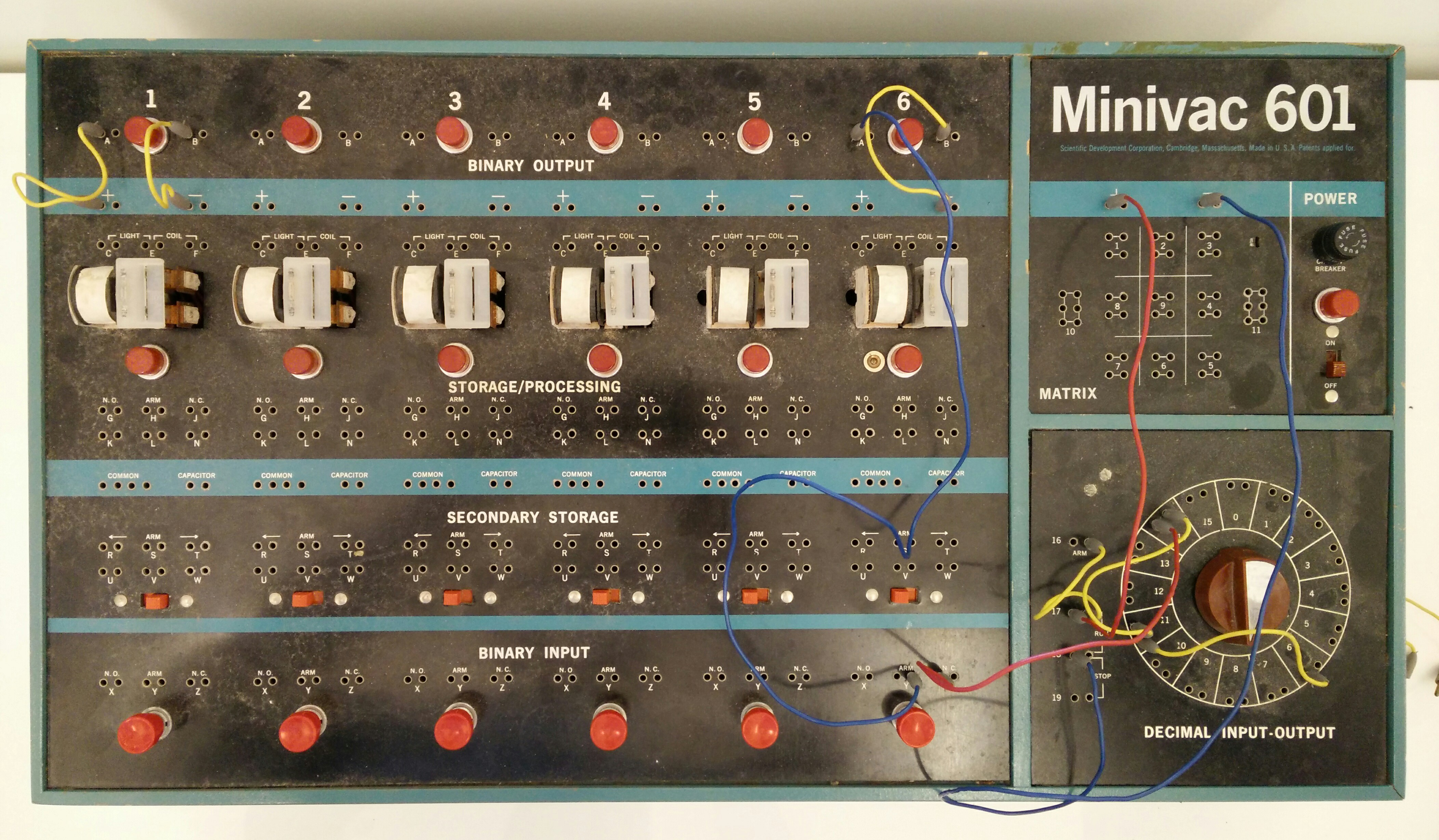
- Developer: Claude Shannon
- Manufacturer: Scientific Development Corporation (Cambridge, Massachusetts, later in Watertown, Massachusetts)
- Type: Electromechanical
- Released: c.1961
- Introductory price: US$85 (equivalent to $915.79 in 2025)
- CPU: (None)
- Memory: 6 bits
- Storage: 6 bits
- Display: 6 indicator lamps, 16-position motorized dial
- Input: 6 slide switches, 6 pushbutton switches, 16-position motorized dial
- Power: 110 VAC
- Dimensions: 5 1/8 x 24 x 13 1/4 in.
- Weight: 9 kilograms (20 lb)

Minivac 601 Digital Computer Kit was an electromechanical digital computer system created by information theory pioneer Claude Shannon and sold by Scientific Development Corporation as an educational toy using digital circuits.

== Description ==
In 1961, the system was sold by Scientific Development Corporation's "Consumer Products Division", which was soon renamed as the "Digital Equipment Division". The Minivac 601 was originally housed in a blue-painted wooden case. It used DPDT electrical relays as logic switches and for temporary data storage. The main board had a six-bit binary input/output array, consisting of simple DPDT slide switches, SPDT pushbutton switches, and indicator lights. A 16-position motorized dial rotary switch could be used to input decimal or hexadecimal numbers, to output numbers, or to act as a clock signal generator.

The components could be interconnected by manually inserting jumper wires fitted with tapered pin connectors into sockets on the main circuit board. The combined components just barely allowed the simple computer to play a winning game of Tic-Tac-Toe, or to simulate a simple elevator control system.

An "advanced and improved" version called the Minivac 6010 was released in early 1962, housed in a gray metal case and featuring higher-quality components. It was supplied with additional patch cords incorporating special resistors, capacitors, and diodes for further capabilities. Although the price was also increased considerably, the system was more successfully sold to the corporate market, rather than as a toy.

In 1962, the Scientific Development Corporation also advertised educational electronic kits based on analog electronics technology.

== Gallery ==
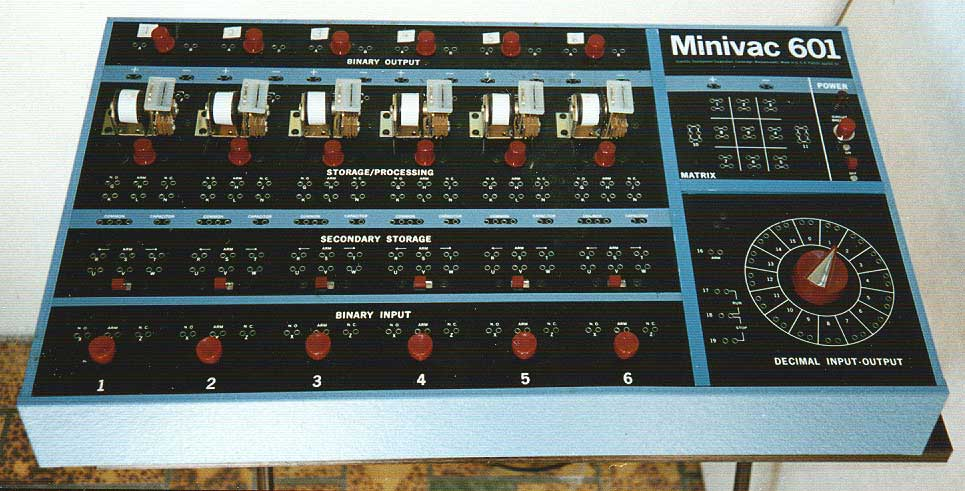
Original blue-painted enclosure

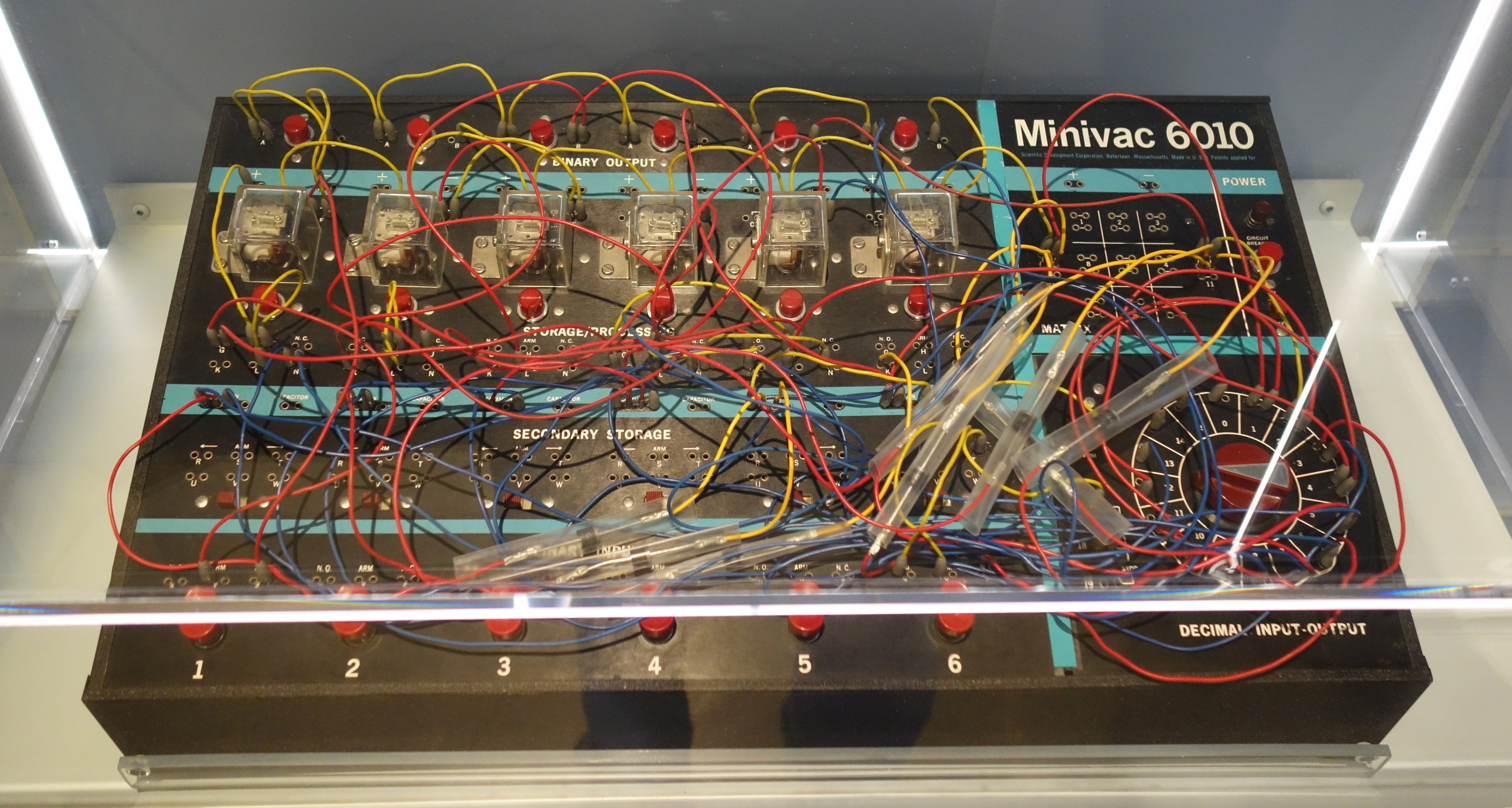
Minivac 6010
