= Thames & Kosmos =

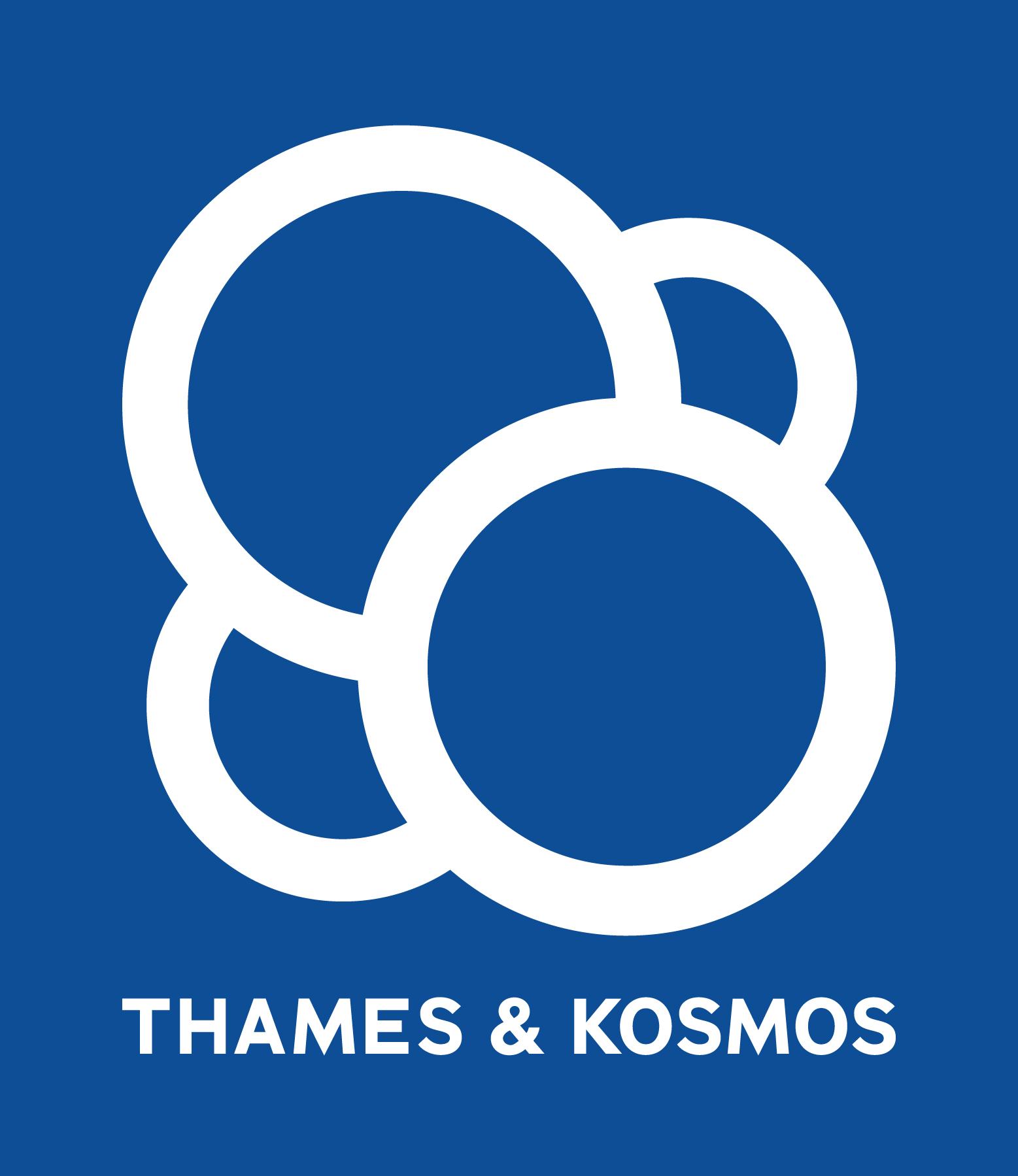
- The logo of Thames & Kosmos.
- Founded: 2001; 25 years ago in Newport, Rhode Island
- Headquarters: 89 Ship Street, Providence, Rhode Island, United States
- Parent: Franckh-Kosmos Verlags-GmbH & Co. KG
- Website: www.thamesandkosmos.com

Thames & Kosmos (T&K) is a publisher of science kits, board games, and craft kits for kids of all ages. The science kits cover topics such as biology, physics, astronomy, and alternative energy. The company places an emphasis on teaching real-world issues, STEM topics, and practical skills through hands-on experimentation and comprehensive reading materials. T&K operates as the exclusive North American subsidiary of the German-based publishing house Franckh-Kosmos Verlags-GmbH & Co. KG – Kosmos for short – which was founded in 1822. T&K translates, rewrites, and distributes Kosmos's science kits, and started to design its own kits in 2005. It also produces kits licensed under other brands, such as National Geographic and The Dangerous Book for Boys. In 2012 the Company expanded its distribution to the UK and in 2015 Thames & Kosmos UK LP was formed as a subsidiary of Kosmos International GmbH. In 2013, Kosmos completed a major investment in Thames & Kosmos and became the official parent company of Thames & Kosmos.

T&K has won awards from Parents' Choice Award, "Best Overall Chemistry Set" from The Wall Street Journal for its CHEM C3000 in 2006, "One of Toy Fair’s Hottest New Products" from The Early Show for its Candy Factory in 2006, awards from Dr. Toy, and Oppenheim Toy Portfolio, among many others.

Thames & Kosmos is a member of the American Specialty Toy Retailing Association and the Toy Industry Association, and has supported the Museum Store Association, and the National School Supply and Equipment Association, among other organizations.

T&K was founded in 2001 and is headquartered in Providence, Rhode Island.

In 2015, T&K started publishing and distributing Kosmos board games in the US and other English-speaking markets.

== Notable products ==
Over the years, Thames & Kosmos has developed and published a wide range of notable educational kits and board games. Among the company's best-known board game releases are Lost Cities and Ubongo, both of which have become popular titles in the family and strategy game categories. In addition to these, Thames & Kosmos has expanded its catalog to include award-winning series such as EXIT: The Game and The Crew, as well as family-oriented games like My City. The science kit portfolio features critically acclaimed products including CHEM C3000, Physics Workshop, and the innovative engineering kit V8 Race Car.

== See also ==
- Board game
- Construction set
- Educational game
- Educational toys
- Edutainment
- STEM
