= Giantmicrobes =

American Toy Company

Giantmicrobes, Inc.
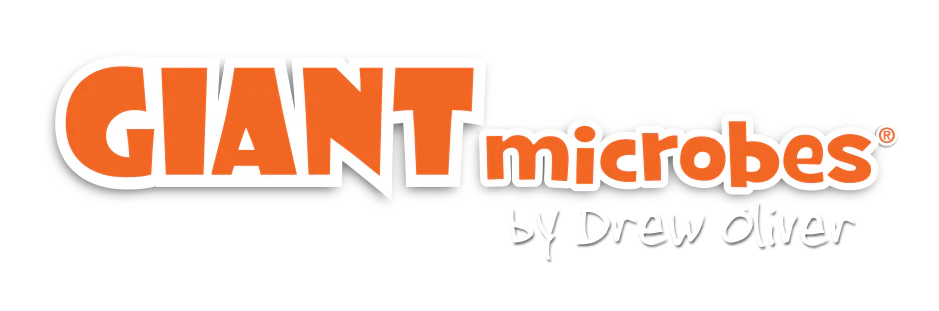
- Founded: 2002
- Founder: Drew Oliver
- Headquarters: Stamford, Connecticut
- Products: Designer plush, stuffed toys
- Website: http://www.giantmicrobes.com/

Giantmicrobes, stylized as GIANTmicrobes, is a toy company based in Stamford, Connecticut, founded by Drew Oliver, which manufactures designer plush stuffed toys of microbes, cells, organs, and other health-related things.

== Appearance ==
The appearance of each 5-7 inch long toy is based on electron micrographs of the real microbe.

== Reception ==
The Telegraph, under a photograph of a pale purple "Kissing Disease plush toy (the Epstein-Barr virus)", described Giantmicrobes as offering a "bizarre" range of soft toys that are popular among students, care workers and children.

Chris Hinton, writing on Wired, describes the range of toys. He suggests that the toys will awaken children's interest in the microscopic world, while they also enjoy them as cuddly toys.

Anna Kuchment in Newsweek magazine writes that toy designer Drew Oliver thought of making giant microbes on reading Richard Feynman's Surely You're Joking, Mr Feynman! which described seeing a microbe in a drop of water. Kuchment describes the product as a combination of "gag gift and educational toy", commenting that it is awkward to market, but admiring Oliver's infectious enthusiasm.
