= Automoblox =

Toy cars

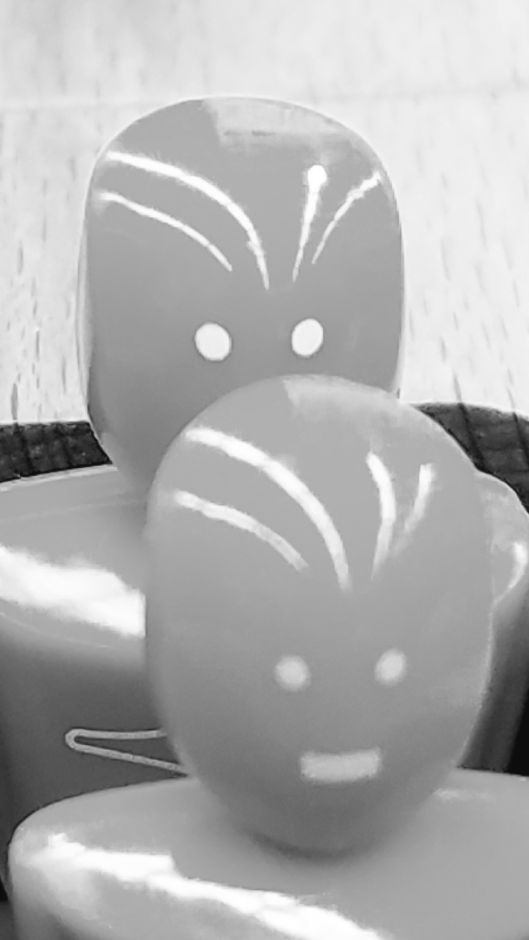
This shows what one version of the automoblox people look like.

Automoblox is a brand name of a wooden car construction toy designed by Patrick Calello and produced by Automoblox Company, LLC of Cranford, New Jersey. The toy consists of wooden car body sections with patented plastic interconnects, polycarbonate wheels and rubber tires, plastic passengers and polycarbonate screens. Each car can be disassembled into its component parts and re-assembled, parts from different cars can be combined to let children design their own models. It is very commonly used to teach CAD They have also been noted for their extensive use in the PLTW program.
