= Tutor Systems =

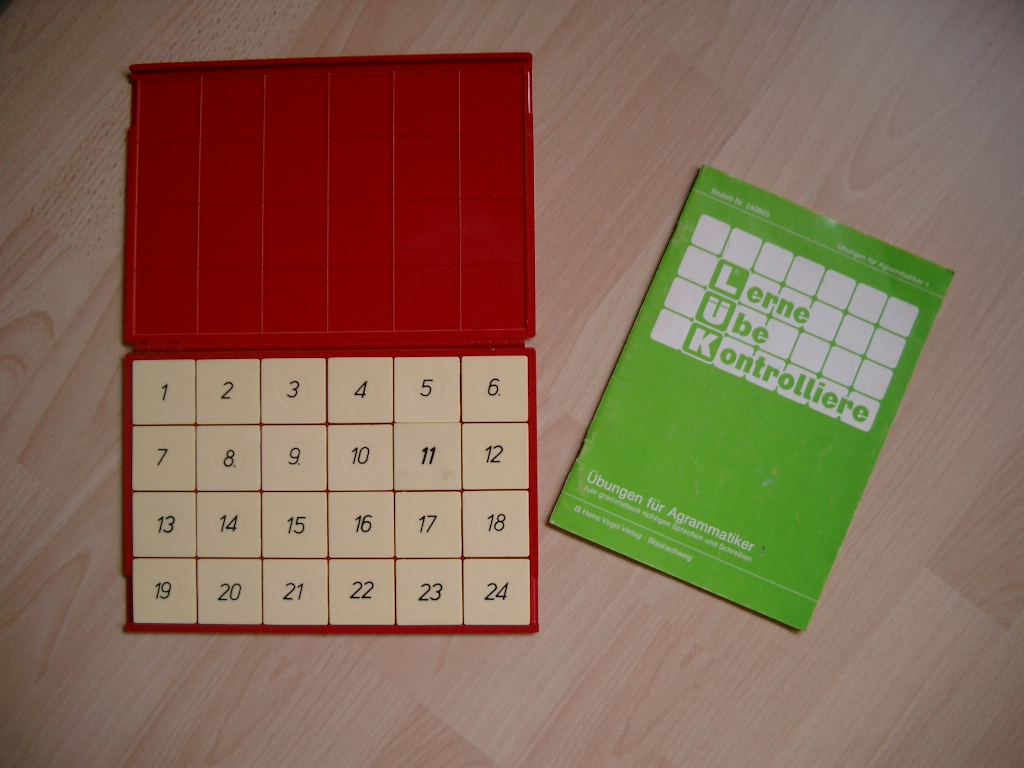
A Tutor Systems box with 24 tiles.

Tutor Systems is an Australian ludic learning tool that allows learners to check their answers for accuracy themselves. There are different sets of tasks, from pre-school to grammar school. This is the English adaptation of German-speaking LÜK, of which LÜK means "lernen, üben, kontrollieren" (learn, practice, check).

== History ==
This learning tool was invented in the 1960s by the German Heinz Vogel (1919-1980) and is still used successfully today at home, in nursery, primary and secondary schools. Australia and New Zealand, Tutor Systems has been published since the 1970s and also exported to Malaysia and Japan. There are versions in 18 languages distributed in 35 countries, including Veritech in France and Canada, LÜK in German-speaking countries, YUP in Turkey, LYCK in Sweden and ARCO in Venezuela. It is produced by Modern Teaching Aid under licence of the Westermann Verlag.

== Use ==
The set consists of a workbook, a flat red box ("Tutor plastic tray") with small depressions and a number of tiles that fit into the depressions and are printed on both sides - on the front with a number, on the back with the part of a motif. The objective is to solve a set of tasks from the workbook and insert the tiles into the tray according to the results. The tray is then closed, turned over and re-opened - comparing the pattern on the back of the tiles and the printed drawing in the workbook, students see if all the tasks have been solved correctly. Already in the first year, more than 15 000 trays were sold. Today about 600 different workbooks are available and cover all school branches.

Tutor Systems is often used like other classical self-control learning devices in the context of individual work. It is used mostly in pre-schools and primary schools, but also in grammar schools and at university to obtain a more sustainable learning success.

== Literature ==
- Blumtritt, Ralf: Testbeispiel : Lernen mit LÜK. In: Schulpraxis 12/1992, p. 26.
- Fritz, Jürgen: Das LÜK-System. In: Lehrmittel aktuell 15/1989, p. 32-33.
- Janet M. Carrington: «The games biochemist play», Biochemical Education, vol. 6, no 4/1978, p. 80–81 (ISSN 1879-1468)
- Poulin, Monique: Véri/Tech, c’est véritablement bien. Lurelu, 73/1985, p. 19.
- Reich, K. (Hg.): Werkstattunterricht. In: Methodenpool. In: url: http://methodenpool.uni-koeln.de
- Schatte, Stephanie: Möglichkeiten des Einsatzes von LÜK-Kästen - erprobt am Beispiel des Faches Englisch - im Zuge eines steigenden Individualisierungsanspruches von Lernen. Solingen, 2011: Landesprüfungsamt.
- Prof. Dr. Leopold Mathelitsch, Renate Bindar: Spielerisch lernen im Physikunterricht. in: Universitätslehrgang „Pädagogik und Fachdidaktik“ Naturwissenschaften. University of Klagenfurt, Institute for Teaching and School Development, Klagenfurt, 2011.
- Alice Vorstandlechner: Mineralogische Themen in der Montessori-Pädagogik. University of Vienna, Vienna, 2008.
- Cohen, Davene: CAPIT Toy Catalog. Rural Education Programm, Northwest Regional Education Laboratory, Portland (Oregon), 1975.
- Joan Yares Schussheim: An Annotated Math Lab Inventory. in: School Science and Mathematics, v80 n6 p513-21 Oct 1980.
