= Digi-Comp =

Digi-Comp may refer to:

- Digi-Comp I, a mechanical toy computer without marbles
- Digi-Comp II, a marble-based mechanical toy computer
- Dr. NIM, a game of Nim based on the Digi-Comp mechanism
