= Think-a-Dot =

Mathematical toy

Principle of the Think-a-Dot mechanism in one of the two starting positions, with a ball just dropped into the left hole – in the interactive SVG file, click a green arrow to drop a ball and a black arrow to reset the puzzle to either starting position

The Think-a-Dot was a mathematical toy invented by Joseph Weisbecker and manufactured by E.S.R., Inc. during the 1960s that demonstrated automata theory. It had eight coloured disks on its front, and three holes on its top – left, right, and center – through which a ball bearing could be dropped. Each disk would display either a yellow or blue face, depending on whether the mechanism behind it was tipped to the right or the left. The Think-a-Dot thus had 2^{8}=256 internal states. When the ball fell to the bottom it would exit either to a hole on the left or the right of the device.

As the ball passed through the Think-a-Dot, it would flip the disk mechanisms that it passed, and they in turn would determine whether the ball would be deflected to the left or to the right. Various puzzles and games were possible with the Think-a-Dot, such as flipping the colours of all cells in the minimum number of moves, or reaching a given state from a monochrome state or vice versa.

== See also ==
- Digi-Comp I
- Digi-Comp II
- Dr. NIM
