= Turing tables =

Turing tables may refer to:

- Tables of specifications for each instruction in a Turing machine
- A misspelling of the song "Turning Tables", by Adele
- A misspelling of the game "Turing Tumble", a toy that teaches how computers work
