= Von Neumann architecture =

Computer architecture where code and data share a common bus

A von Neumann architecture scheme

The von Neumann architecture—also known as the von Neumann model or Princeton architecture—is a computer architecture based on the First Draft of a Report on the EDVAC, written by John von Neumann in 1945, describing designs by John Mauchly and J. Presper Eckert at the University of Pennsylvania's Moore School of Electrical Engineering. The document describes a design architecture for an electronic digital computer made of "organs" that were later understood to have these components:

- A central arithmetic unit to perform arithmetic operations;
- A central control unit to sequence operations performed by the machine;
- Memory that stores data and instructions;
- An "outside recording medium" to store input to and output from the machine;
- Input and output mechanisms to transfer data between the memory and the outside recording medium.

The attribution of the invention of the architecture to von Neumann is incorrect. Eckert and Mauchly had essentially finished designing a stored program computer before discussing the ideas with von Neumann and Herman Goldstine.

The term "von Neumann architecture" has evolved to refer to any stored-program computer in which an instruction fetch and a data operation cannot occur at the same time (since they share a common bus). This is referred to as the von Neumann bottleneck, which often limits the performance of the corresponding system. According to Michael Williams, when people speak of the "von Neumann architecture", it is describing getting a word from memory with the bits in parallel, as with the IAS machine, instead of in series.

The von Neumann architecture is simpler than the Harvard architecture (which has one dedicated set of address and data buses for reading and writing to memory and another set of address and data buses to fetch instructions).

A stored-program computer uses the same underlying mechanism to encode both program instructions and data as opposed to designs which use a mechanism such as discrete plugboard wiring or fixed control circuitry for instruction implementation. Stored-program computers were an advancement over the manually reconfigured or fixed function computers of the 1940s, such as the Colossus and the ENIAC. These were programmed by setting switches and inserting patch cables to route data and control signals between various functional units.

The vast majority of modern computers use the same hardware mechanism to encode and store both data and program instructions, but have caches between the CPU and memory, and, for the caches closest to the CPU, have separate caches for instructions and data, so that most instruction and data fetches use separate buses (split-cache architecture).

== History ==
The earliest computing machines had fixed programs. Some very simple computers still use this design, either for simplicity or training purposes. For example, a desk calculator (in principle) is a fixed-program computer. It can do basic mathematics, but it cannot run a word processor or games. Changing the program of a fixed-program machine requires rewiring, restructuring, or redesigning the machine. The earliest computers were not so much "programmed" as "designed" for a particular task. "Reprogramming"—when possible at all—was a laborious process that started with flowcharts and paper notes, followed by detailed engineering designs, and then the often-arduous process of physically rewiring and rebuilding the machine. It could take three weeks to set up and debug a program on ENIAC.

With the proposal of the stored-program computer, this changed. A stored-program computer includes, by design, an instruction set, and can store in memory a set of instructions (a program) that details the computation.

A stored-program design also allows for self-modifying code. One early motivation for such a facility was the need for a program to increment or otherwise modify the address portion of instructions, which operators had to do manually in early designs. This became less important when index registers and indirect addressing became usual features of machine architecture. Another use was to embed frequently used data in the instruction stream using immediate addressing.

== Capabilities ==
On a large scale, the ability to treat instructions as data is what makes assemblers, compilers, linkers, loaders, and other automated programming tools possible. It makes "programs that write programs" possible. This has made a sophisticated self-hosting computing ecosystem flourish around von Neumann architecture machines.

Some high-level languages leverage the von Neumann architecture by providing an abstract, machine-independent way to manipulate executable code at runtime (e.g., LISP), or by using runtime information to tune just-in-time compilation (e.g. languages hosted on the Java virtual machine, or languages embedded in web browsers).

On a smaller scale, some repetitive operations such as BITBLT or pixel and vertex shaders can be accelerated on general purpose processors with just-in-time compilation techniques. This is one use of self-modifying code that has remained popular.

== Development of the stored-program concept ==
The mathematician Alan Turing, who had been alerted to a problem of mathematical logic by the lectures of Max Newman at the University of Cambridge, wrote a paper in 1936 entitled On Computable Numbers, with an Application to the Entscheidungsproblem, which was published in the Proceedings of the London Mathematical Society. In it he described a hypothetical machine he called a universal computing machine, now known as the "Universal Turing machine". The hypothetical machine had an infinite store (memory in today's terminology) that contained both instructions and data. John von Neumann became acquainted with Turing while he was a visiting professor at Cambridge in 1935, and also during Turing's PhD year at the Institute for Advanced Study in Princeton, New Jersey during 1936–1937. Whether he knew of Turing's paper of 1936 at that time is not clear.

In 1936, Konrad Zuse also anticipated, in two patent applications, that machine instructions could be stored in the same storage used for data.

Independently, J. Presper Eckert and John Mauchly, who were developing the ENIAC at the Moore School of Electrical Engineering of the University of Pennsylvania, wrote about the stored-program concept in December 1943. In planning a new machine, EDVAC, Eckert wrote in January 1944 that they would store data and programs in a new addressable memory device, a mercury metal delay-line memory. This was the first time the construction of a practical stored-program machine was proposed. At that time, he and Mauchly were not aware of Turing's work.

Von Neumann was involved in the Manhattan Project at the Los Alamos National Laboratory. It required huge amounts of calculation, and thus drew him to the ENIAC project, during the summer of 1944. There he joined the ongoing discussions on the design of this stored-program computer, the EDVAC. As part of that group, he wrote up a description titled First Draft of a Report on the EDVAC based on the work of Eckert and Mauchly. It was unfinished when his colleague Herman Goldstine circulated it, and bore only von Neumann's name (to the consternation of Eckert and Mauchly). The paper was read by dozens of von Neumann's colleagues in America and Europe, and influenced the next round of computer designs.

Jack Copeland considers that it is "historically inappropriate to refer to electronic stored-program digital computers as 'von Neumann machines'". His Los Alamos colleague Stan Frankel said of von Neumann's regard for Turing's ideas.

I know that in or about 1943 or '44 von Neumann was well aware of the fundamental importance of Turing's paper of 1936.... Von Neumann introduced me to that paper and at his urging I studied it with care. Many people have acclaimed von Neumann as the "father of the computer" (in a modern sense of the term) but I am sure that he would never have made that mistake himself. He might well be called the midwife, perhaps, but he firmly emphasized to me, and to others I am sure, that the fundamental conception is owing to Turing—in so far as not anticipated by Babbage.... Both Turing and von Neumann, of course, also made substantial contributions to the "reduction to practice" of these concepts but I would not regard these as comparable in importance with the introduction and explication of the concept of a computer able to store in its memory its program of activities and of modifying that program in the course of these activities.

At the time that the "First Draft" report was circulated, Turing was producing a report entitled Proposed Electronic Calculator. It described in engineering and programming detail, his idea of a machine he called the Automatic Computing Engine (ACE). He presented this to the executive committee of the British National Physical Laboratory on February 19, 1946. Although Turing knew from his wartime experience at Bletchley Park that what he proposed was feasible, the secrecy surrounding Colossus, that was subsequently maintained for several decades, prevented him from saying so. Various successful implementations of the ACE design were produced.

Both von Neumann's and Turing's papers described stored-program computers, but von Neumann's earlier paper achieved greater circulation and the computer architecture it outlined became known as the "von Neumann architecture". In the 1953 publication Faster than Thought: A Symposium on Digital Computing Machines (edited by B. V. Bowden), a section in the chapter on Computers in America reads as follows:

The Machine of the Institute For Advanced Study, Princeton

In 1945, Professor J. von Neumann, who was then working at the Moore School of Engineering in Philadelphia, where the E.N.I.A.C. had been built, issued on behalf of a group of his co-workers, a report on the logical design of digital computers. The report contained a detailed proposal for the design of the machine that has since become known as the E.D.V.A.C. (electronic discrete variable automatic computer). This machine has only recently been completed in America, but the von Neumann report inspired the construction of the E.D.S.A.C. (electronic delay-storage automatic calculator) in Cambridge (see p. 130).

In 1947, Burks, Goldstine and von Neumann published another report that outlined the design of another type of machine (a parallel machine this time) that would be exceedingly fast, capable perhaps of 20,000 operations per second. They pointed out that the outstanding problem in constructing such a machine was the development of suitable memory with instantaneously accessible contents. At first they suggested using a special vacuum tube—called the "Selectron"—which the Princeton Laboratories of RCA had invented. These tubes were expensive and difficult to make, so von Neumann subsequently decided to build a machine based on the Williams memory. This machine—completed in June, 1952 in Princeton—has become popularly known as the Maniac. The design of this machine inspired at least half a dozen machines now being built in America, all known affectionately as "Johniacs".

In the same book, the first two paragraphs of a chapter on ACE read as follows:

Automatic Computation at the National Physical Laboratory

One of the most modern digital computers which embodies developments and improvements in the technique of automatic electronic computing was recently demonstrated at the National Physical Laboratory, Teddington, where it has been designed and built by a small team of mathematicians and electronics research engineers on the staff of the Laboratory, assisted by a number of production engineers from the English Electric Company, Limited. The equipment so far erected at the Laboratory is only the pilot model of a much larger installation which will be known as the Automatic Computing Engine, but although comparatively small in bulk and containing only about 800 thermionic valves, as can be judged from Plates XII, XIII and XIV, it is an extremely rapid and versatile calculating machine.

The basic concepts and abstract principles of computation by a machine were formulated by Dr. A. M. Turing, F.R.S., in a paper^{1}. read before the London Mathematical Society in 1936, but work on such machines in Britain was delayed by the war. In 1945, however, an examination of the problems was made at the National Physical Laboratory by Mr. J. R. Womersley, then superintendent of the Mathematics Division of the Laboratory. He was joined by Dr. Turing and a small staff of specialists, and, by 1947, the preliminary planning was sufficiently advanced to warrant the establishment of the special group already mentioned. In April, 1948, the latter became the Electronics Section of the Laboratory, under the charge of Mr. F. M. Colebrook.

== Early von Neumann-architecture computers ==
The First Draft described a design that was used by many universities and corporations to construct their computers. Among these various computers, only ILLIAC and ORDVAC had compatible instruction sets.

- ARC2 (Birkbeck, University of London) officially came online on May 12, 1948.
- Manchester Baby (Victoria University of Manchester, England) made its first successful run of a stored program on June 21, 1948.
- EDSAC (University of Cambridge, England) was the first practical stored-program electronic computer (May 1949)
- Manchester Mark 1 (University of Manchester, England) Developed from the Baby (June 1949)
- CSIRAC (Council for Scientific and Industrial Research) Australia (November 1949)
- MESM at the Kiev Institute of Electrotechnology in Kiev, Ukrainian SSR (November 1950)
- EDVAC (Ballistic Research Laboratory, Computing Laboratory at Aberdeen Proving Ground 1951)
- IAS machine at Institute for Advanced Study (1951)
- ORDVAC (University of Illinois) at Aberdeen Proving Ground, Maryland (completed November 1951)
- MANIAC I at Los Alamos Scientific Laboratory (March 1952)
- ILLIAC at the University of Illinois, (September 1952)
- BESM-1 in Moscow (1952)
- AVIDAC at Argonne National Laboratory (1953)
- ORACLE at Oak Ridge National Laboratory (June 1953)
- BESK in Stockholm (1953)
- JOHNNIAC at RAND Corporation (January 1954)
- DASK in Denmark (1955)
- WEIZAC at the Weizmann Institute of Science in Rehovot, Israel (1955)
- PERM in Munich (1956)
- SILLIAC in Sydney (1956)

== Early stored-program computers ==
The date information in the following chronology is difficult to put into proper order. Some dates are for first running a test program, some dates are the first time the computer was demonstrated or completed, and some dates are for the first delivery or installation.

- The IBM SSEC had the ability to treat instructions as data, and was publicly demonstrated on January 27, 1948. This ability was claimed in a US patent. However it was partially electromechanical, not fully electronic. In practice, instructions were read from paper tape due to its limited memory.
- The ARC2 developed by Andrew Booth and Kathleen Booth at Birkbeck, University of London officially came online on May 12, 1948. It featured the first rotating magnetic drum storage device.
- The Manchester Baby was the first fully electronic computer to run a stored program. It ran a factoring program for 52 minutes on June 21, 1948, after running a simple division program and a program to show that two numbers were relatively prime.
- The ENIAC was modified to run as a primitive read-only stored-program computer (using the Function Tables for program ROM) and was demonstrated as such on September 16, 1948, running a program by Adele Goldstine for von Neumann.
- The BINAC ran some test programs in February, March, and April 1949, although was not completed until September 1949.
- The Manchester Mark 1 developed from the Baby project. An intermediate version of the Mark 1 was available to run programs in April 1949, but was not completed until October 1949.
- The EDSAC ran its first program on May 6, 1949.
- The EDVAC was delivered in August 1949, but it had problems that kept it from being put into regular operation until 1951.
- The CSIR Mk I ran its first program in November 1949.
- The SEAC was demonstrated in April 1950.
- The Pilot ACE ran its first program on May 10, 1950, and was demonstrated in December 1950.
- The SWAC was completed in July 1950.
- The Whirlwind was completed in December 1950 and was in actual use in April 1951.
- The first ERA Atlas (later the commercial ERA 1101/UNIVAC 1101) was installed in December 1950.

== Evolution ==
Single system bus evolution of the architecture

Through the decades of the 1960s and 1970s computers generally became both smaller and faster, which led to evolutions in their architecture. For example, memory-mapped I/O lets input and output devices be treated the same as memory. A single system bus could be used to provide a modular system with lower cost. This is sometimes called a "streamlining" of the architecture. In subsequent decades, simple microcontrollers would sometimes omit features of the model to lower cost and size. Larger computers added features for higher performance.

== Design limitations ==
=== Von Neumann bottleneck ===
The use of the same bus to fetch instructions and data leads to the von Neumann bottleneck, the limited throughput (data transfer rate) between the central processing unit (CPU) and memory compared to the amount of memory. Because the single bus can only access one of the two classes of memory at a time, throughput is lower than the rate at which the CPU can work. This seriously limits the effective processing speed when the CPU is required to perform minimal processing on large amounts of data. The CPU is continually forced to wait for needed data to move to or from memory. Since CPU speed and memory size have increased much faster than the throughput between them, the bottleneck has become more of a problem, a problem whose severity increases with every new generation of CPU.

The von Neumann bottleneck was described by John Backus in his 1977 ACM Turing Award lecture. According to Backus:

Surely there must be a less primitive way of making big changes in the store than by pushing vast numbers of words back and forth through the von Neumann bottleneck. Not only is this tube a literal bottleneck for the data traffic of a problem, but, more importantly, it is an intellectual bottleneck that has kept us tied to word-at-a-time thinking instead of encouraging us to think in terms of the larger conceptual units of the task at hand. Thus programming is basically planning and detailing the enormous traffic of words through the von Neumann bottleneck, and much of that traffic concerns not significant data itself, but where to find it.

==== Mitigations ====
There are several known methods for mitigating the Von Neumann performance bottleneck. For example, the following all can improve performance:

- Providing a cache between the CPU and the main memory.
- Providing separate caches or separate access paths for data and instructions (the so-called modified Harvard architecture).
- Using branch predictor algorithms and logic.
- Providing a limited CPU stack or other on-chip scratchpad memory to reduce memory access.
- Implementing the CPU and the memory hierarchy as a system on chip, providing greater locality of reference and thus reducing latency and increasing throughput between processor registers and main memory.

The problem can also be sidestepped somewhat by using parallel computing, using for example the non-uniform memory access (NUMA) architecture—this approach is commonly employed by supercomputers.

=== Self-modifying code ===
Aside from the von Neumann bottleneck, the architecture allows for self-modifying code, an unsafe practice. If there is no form of memory protection to prevent overwriting of code, a malfunctioning program can damage itself, other programs, or the operating system, possibly leading to a computer crash or incorrect output.

== See also ==
- CARDboard Illustrative Aid to Computation
- Interconnect bottleneck
- Little Man Computer (LMC)
- Random-access machine
- Turing machine
