= Brainiac =

Supervillain in the DC Universe

- Variant cover of Action Comics #1064 (June 2024). Art by Ariel Colón.

Publication information
- Publisher: DC Comics
- First appearance: Action Comics #242 (July 1958)
- Created by: Otto Binder (writer); Al Plastino (artist)

In-story information
- Alter ego: Vril Dox
- Species: Coluan artificial intelligence
- Place of origin: Colu
- Team affiliations: Anti-Justice League; Legion of Doom
- Notable aliases: Collector of Worlds; Terror of Kandor; Milton Fine; Pulsar Stargrave
- Abilities: See list: Twelfth-level intelligence; Superhuman strength, speed, and durability; Flight; Technopathy; Telepathy; Telekinesis; Self-sustenance; Immortality; Regeneration; Energy absorption and projection

Brainiac is a supervillain appearing in American comic books published by DC Comics. Created by writer Otto Binder and artist Al Plastino, Brainiac first appeared in Action Comics #242 (1958), and has since endured as one of Superman's greatest enemies.

Brainiac is commonly depicted as a superintelligent android or cyborg from the planet Colu who is obsessed with collecting all knowledge in the known universe. He travels the galaxy and shrinks cities to bottle size for preservation on his skull-shaped spaceship before destroying their source planets, believing the knowledge he acquires to be most valuable if he alone possesses it. Among these shrunken cities is Kandor, the capital of Superman's home planet Krypton, and Brainiac is even responsible for Krypton's destruction in some continuities. Regarded as one of the most dangerous threats in the DC Universe, Brainiac comes into repeated conflict with Superman and the Justice League. Although stories often end in Brainiac's apparent destruction, the character's artificial consciousness is resurrected in new physical forms, some robotic and others more organic-based in appearance.

The character has been adapted in various media incarnations, having been portrayed in live-action by James Marsters in Smallville and Blake Ritson in Krypton, Nikolai Witschl in Superman & Lois, and is set to appear in the DC Universe (DCU) film Man of Tomorrow (2027), portrayed by Lars Eidinger. Corey Burton, John Noble, Jeffrey Combs, Michael Emerson, and others have provided Brainiac's voice in animation and video games. The character's name, a portmanteau of the words brain and maniac, is believed by etymologists to be the inspiration for the informal noun brainiac, meaning freakishly intelligent person, which entered common use in the 1970s.

== Fictional character biography ==
=== Silver Age ===
The first Brainiac/Kandor comic book story in Action Comics #242 (July 1958) was based on a story arc in the Superman comic strip from April through August 1958. In the comic strip story, Superman's foe was named Romado, who traveled the cosmos with a white alien monkey named Koko, shrinking major cities and keeping them in glass jars. The strip's Kryptonian bottled city was named Dur-El-Va. This cross-continuity conflict was not unprecedented; in 1958 and '59, editor Mort Weisinger used the comic strip to prototype a number of concepts that he planned to introduce in the book, including Bizarro and red kryptonite.

Brainiac is a bald, green-skinned humanoid who arrives on Earth and shrinks various cities, including Metropolis, storing them in bottles with the intent of using them to restore the then-unnamed planet he ruled. He was originally notable only for having shrunk the bottle city of Kandor with his shrinking ray and for using a force field. In his initial story, he also traveled with a white monkey-like alien named Koko; the monkey also appears in a 1960 Superman story retelling the story of Kandor's disappearance (Superman #141 (November 1960)). Koko was quickly dropped from Brainiac's stories, but a version of the character has made sporadic appearances as the villain's pet in the series Justice and the 2008 storyline "Brainiac" in Action Comics. The villain's descendant Brainiac 5 also had a pet named Koko for several stories in the 1990s.

In subsequent appearances in this early period, Brainiac was used mostly as a plot device rather than as a featured villain of the month. Brainiac's next appearance was mostly behind the scenes, when he tried to kill Lois Lane and Lana Lang, prompting Superman to give Lois and Lana superpowers. But the villain remained unseen except as a plot twist at the end of the story. Brainiac's next appearance was in "Superman's Return to Krypton" in Superman #141 (November 1960), in which the villain stole the bottle city of Kandor, the only city on Krypton that believes Jor-El's warning of doom for the planet, and which had already built a space ark within the city to save the population. Brainiac's next present-day appearance was in Action Comics #275 (April 1961), which showed the villain planning to defeat Superman by exposing him to red-green kryptonite, which he had created, giving Superman a third eye on the back of his head, forcing him to wear various hats to hide it. Superman soon defeated Brainiac and sent him off into the distant past. This was the first in-story appearance of Brainiac's iconic red diode/electrode-like objects atop his head, which had previously appeared on the cover of his first appearance in Action Comics #242 (July 1958), but were not shown in the actual story. In Superboy #106 (July 1963), an infant Superman meets Brainiac, and it is explained that Brainiac looks the same due to his 200-year life span. In Superman #93, Brainiac regenerates himself. It is revealed that he came from a planet called Bryak and, after a voyage in space, he returned to find everybody dead from a plague. He intended to get people from other planets (in shrunken cities to be enlarged with his growth ray) to repopulate Bryak, where he would rule them.

Brainiac's legacy was revealed in Action Comics #276 (May 1961), in a Legion of Super-Heroes back-up story. This story introduced Brainiac 5, who claimed to be Brainiac's 30th-century descendant. Unlike his ancestor, Brainiac 5 used his "twelfth-level intellect" for the forces of good and joined the Legion alongside Supergirl, with whom he fell in love. His home planet was given variously as Bryak, Yod, Yod-Colu, or simply Colu. 20th century Colu is a rim world found on the approach to the Magellanic Clouds.

In Superman #167 (February 1964), it was retconned that Brainiac was a robot created by the Computer Tyrants of Colu to spy on and invade other worlds. Brainiac's distinctive forehead diodes are explained as "electric terminals of his sensory nerves" necessary for him to function. To explain the 1961 introduction of the villain's living descendant Brainiac 5, the story reveals the Computer Tyrants provided the villain with an assistant, a young Coluan boy named Vril Dox tasked with masquerading as his "son" so others would believe Brainiac to be a trustworthy organic alien scientist with a family rather than a deadly robot. The young boy Vril Dox was designated "Brainiac 2". In the same issue, the letter column contained a "special announcement" explaining that the change in the characterization of Brainiac was "in deference" to the "Brainiac Computer Kit", a toy computer created by Edmund Berkeley and based on the Geniac that predated the creation of the comic book character.

In this same story, Lex Luthor discovers the Computer Tyrants could have given their robot villain a twelfth-level intellect but only gave him a tenth-level, the same as them, so he would not dominate them. Luthor frees Brainiac from imprisonment and increases his intellect to a twelfth-level one. He also implants a device to temporarily disable him or destroy him if necessary. The two join forces, but Brainiac later removes the device and blocks out Luthor's memory of his inner workings and the fact that he is a machine. This story becomes the first of many Brainiac/Luthor team-ups. Meanwhile, Vril Dox leads a revolt against the Computer Tyrants, eventually destroying them and freeing Colu. Brainiac sees a monument to this when he returns to Colu later on.

King Kull later enlisted Brainiac and Mister Atom of Earth-S to attack the city of Tomorrow and speed up the rotation enough for the people of Earth to fly into the air. They are defeated by Green Lantern of Earth-Two, Green Lantern of Earth-One, Flash of Earth-Two, Flash of Earth-One, Mercury of Earth-S, and Ibis the Invincible of Earth-S.

==== 30th century (Pre-Crisis) ====
At some indeterminate point in time, Brainiac fled into the 30th century. Developing the ability to absorb and manipulate stellar energy, he remade himself as Pulsar Stargrave. (Note: As revealed in Superboy and the Legion of Super-Heroes #226–227 (April–May 1977)) He became a powerful enemy of the Legion of Super-Heroes, and once masqueraded as Brainiac 5's biological father until he is killed by his own blast. In current continuity, Brainiac's connection to Pulsar Stargrave remains an open question, one even Brainiac 5 has yet to resolve.

=== Bronze Age ===
Brainiac's robotic incarnation in Action Comics #544; art by Ed Hannigan

After Brainiac was revealed to be a robotic being, some stories would end him seemingly being destroyed, only for him to appear again in a repaired body or having transmitted his consciousness into a new form. Since he was essentially a living computer program that could be housed in different forms if "killed", Brainiac was sometimes referred to on comic book covers as "the villain who won't die!".

In the 1980s, DC Comics attempted to re-define several aspects of Superman's stories to boost sagging sales. In Action Comics #544-546 (June–August 1983), Lex Luthor acquires a renewed sense of purpose and dons a high-tech warsuit, while Brainiac is reimagined by writer Marv Wolfman and artist Gil Kane and given a new appearance designed by Ed Hannigan. In a previous story, Brainiac had constructed a giant, computer-controlled planet to destroy Superman only to then be defeated and trapped in the planet's core. In Wolfman and Kane's story "Rebirth", published in Action Comics #544, Brainiac attempts to free himself by causing the nearby star, Epsilon 4, to go nova and utilize its energy. Instead, his body is converted into energy; his living program, his consciousness, experiences a strange journey before returning to his technology, where a new body is created for him over the next few months. As Brainiac recollects, during his journey he saw a great hand reach out from a void, ensnaring him briefly before releasing him. He also remembers seeing Superman's face at the same time. Reborn in a new body, the villain believes he has seen the Master Programmer, the divine force behind the universe's creation, and that this entity created Superman as an "angel of death" to destroy Brainiac. More determined than ever to kill and study Superman, Brainiac now has a colder, more merciless, and robot-like personality than before. He claims to lack emotions, yet shows signs of hatred and fear in regards to Superman. His new body is overtly robotic with a skull-like face and a reflective, iridescent honeycomb-patterned "braincase." He also creates a starship shaped like his new skull and adorned by metal tendrils, often referred to by fans and comic creators as the "skull ship." The ship acts as an extension of Brainiac himself. Brainiac retains this robotic appearance until after the Crisis on Infinite Earths miniseries ends in 1986, rebooting DC Comics continuity.

This incarnation of Brainiac meets his final end in the "Whatever Happened to the Man of Tomorrow?" storyline that ended the pre-Crisis Silver/Bronze Age Superman chronology. Lex Luthor finds Brainiac's robotic head unit, with barely any power left. He hopes to team up with the evil living program again, only to become an unwilling host body for Brainiac instead. Fighting Brainiac's control, Luthor begs a superpowered Lana Lang to kill him, who complies by breaking his neck. Luthor dies and Brainiac retains control of the body for a short time until rigor mortis sets in. "Propelled by sheer malice", Brainiac's head unit leaves Luthor's corpse and crawls a few inches before running out of power.

=== Modern Age ===
In the post-Crisis DC Universe, Brainiac's history was completely rewritten. The post-Crisis version of Brainiac was a radical Coluan scientist named Vril Dox who was sentenced to death after attempting to overthrow the Computer Tyrants of Colu. In his last moments before disintegration, his consciousness was attracted light years away to Milton Fine, a human sideshow mentalist who worked under the alias "The Amazing Brainiac". Needing cranial fluid to maintain his possession of Fine, Dox went on a murder spree. He discovered that Fine was a metahuman with psychic powers, which he frequently wielded against Superman.

==== "Panic in the Sky" ====
In 1990, Brainiac is able to take over the minds of several LexCorp staffers. He makes the scientists create a new version of the skull ship (saying he thought of the design "in a dream") and use advanced genetic science to grow a new body for himself, resembling Milton Fine's form but taller, more physically fit, and with the green skin of a Coluan. He also has a new braincase helmet that resembles his Silver Age diodes. Now free of Fine's body and consciousness completely but still possessing the man's metahuman telepathic powers, Brainiac confronted Superman and then left Earth to plan another attack.

Brainiac returned in the "Panic in the Sky" storyline after seizing control of the mobile planetary fortress Warworld and recruiting assistance from Maxima and the alien warrior Draaga. Discovering a lost and confused Matrix (an artificial life form who operates as Supergirl), Brainiac brainwashes her into becoming his soldier. He clashes with the New Gods and then launches a pre-emptive strike on Earth. Rather than wait for an invasion, Superman gathers a large group of superheroes and allies, one team attacking Warworld directly while the other remains on Earth to counter further attacks. Through duplicates of his braincase, Brainiac briefly takes control of some of Earth's heroes, but ultimately he fails. Supergirl and the other heroes are freed from mental control and the villain is rendered catatonic. His vegetative body is taken to New Genesis for observation.

==== "Dead Again" ====
A year after the seeming death and then return of Superman, a dead body matching the Kryptonian's appearance is found in his abandoned tomb, leading some to wonder if the hero's return was a deception. It is revealed that Brainiac is no longer on New Genesis but revived and returned to Earth, leaving behind an illusion that he remained comatose. While hidden, he created more delusions to turn the public against Superman and make the hero question his own sanity. The two battle and Superman taunts the villain by insisting he is just Milton Fine, a cheap entertainer. Fine's personality seemingly emerges and shuts down the Brainiac persona. Fine is escorted off to a psychiatric facility.

==== The Doomsday Wars ====
During a later skirmish with Superman, Fine's body is irreparably damaged, leaving Brainiac with only a short time to live. With help from a new Coluan assistant named Prin Vnok, Brainiac retrieves Doomsday, the monster that seemingly killed Superman before, and uses him as a new host body. Now a cunning psychic with a super-strong, near-indestructible body, Brainiac attacks the Justice League. Doomsday's own mind fights back and Brainiac realizes he still needs a suitable host. Hoping to create a clone Doomsday form by manipulating human DNA, Brainiac attempts to steal the newborn child of Pete Ross and Lana Lang, who was born prematurely and is being transported to a NICU for treatment. Brainiac sees this as an opportunity for revenge, correctly concluding that Ross and Lang are close to him. Using a 'psi-blocker' device, Superman thwarts Brainiac's plans and the villain is forced to house his consciousness within a completely robotic body. Dubbing his new form Brainiac 2.5, the villain fears he is now trapped in this form.

==== Brainiac 13 ====
Brainiac 13. Art by Ed McGuinness, Steve Kim, and Tommy Yune.

At the turn of the millennium, Brainiac 2.5 revealed that he had placed a sleeper virus in LexCorp's Y2K bug safeguards. This virus was intended to dramatically boost his abilities. However, the virus instead allowed his upgraded future self, Brainiac 13 (or "B-13"), to travel from the 64th century to the present day and take control of Brainiac 2.5's body.

Brainiac 13 then began transforming Metropolis into the 64th-century version of the city, which he controlled, and also began upgrading Metallo into a giant-sized version of himself. Brainiac 13 then took control of several android superheroes, such as Red Tornado and Hourman, and used them against Superman. The Metal Men's responsometers were able to protect them from his programming, and allowed them to help defeat Metallo.

During a fight with the Eradicator (who was attempting to 'hijack' the B13 virus and use it for its own ends), Superman discovered that Brainiac 13 could not cope with Kryptonian technology, due to incompatibility issues. This gave Superman a plan to stop Brainiac 13's scheme. With the aid of the rebuilt Kelex, Superman tricked Luthor into connecting a Kryptonian battlesuit to one of Brainiac 13's power conduits. Kelex reactivated Red Tornado to help Superman break Brainiac 13 down into his respective nanobots and trap him in the suit.

Brainiac 13 was able to work with Brainiac 2.5—now transferred into the aged body of Lena Luthor—and prepared a tactic against Imperiex. The Brainiacs successfully engineered Imperiex's defeat, allowing Brainiac 13 to absorb Imperiex's power and use it to overpower the combined heroes and villains of the universe while simultaneously devastating both Earth and Apokolips. Brainiac 13 plans to use the power he stole from Imperiex to conquer the universe and reshape it in his image, and is made so powerful by the absorption that none of the heroes, not even Superman, can hope to damage him. However, with help from Luthor's temporal displacement technology and Darkseid's Boom Tube technology boosted by magic supplied by Tempest and the Amazons, Superman destroys Brainiac 13 and Imperiex by sending them through a temporal Boom Tube where they are annihilated in the Big Bang.

After the death of Brainiac 13, Superman discovered that the version of Krypton he previously visited via the Phantom Zone was a trap created by Brainiac 13. Having been defeated by Kryptonian technology, Brainiac 13 had traveled back in time to the real Krypton prior to its destruction. There, he stole the Eradicator matrix and Jor-El's diaries, and created a false Krypton based on Jor-El's favorite period in history.

Sometime later, Superman traveled into the future and battled Brainiac 12. He learned that everything Brainiac 13 did in the past was designed to ensure things reached the point where Brainiac 13 would be created. Brainiac 12's defeat before his upgrade apparently reversed the advances Brainiac 13 had made to Metropolis.

==== The Insiders ====
Around the time of the Graduation Day event, a future version of Brainiac called Brainiac 6 used his "granddaughter" Brainiac 8 (also known as Indigo), to kill Donna Troy and ensure the fate of Colu. Indigo then infiltrated the Outsiders until she attacked the team, along with Brainiac 6 and his allies, Lex Luthor, and a brainwashed Superboy (Conner Kent), who had attacked the Teen Titans. In the ensuing battle, Indigo died and Superboy broke away from the brainwashing, while Luthor escaped. While his ship was ultimately destroyed by Thunder's density manipulation, Brainiac 6's condition and whereabouts after the battle are unknown.

==== Silver Age Brainiac in the Post-Crisis universe ====
Later stories revealed that elements of Brainiac's pre-Crisis history occurred in the post-Crisis character's history prior to his possession of Milton Fine and his first encounter with Superman. The citizens of Kandor recall that Brainiac stole their city from Krypton, and not the alien wizard Tolos.

History of the DC Universe mentions his defeat by the Omega Men, although this is not seen in Crisis on Infinite Earths itself, and noted a second Brainiac was created in a laboratory on Earth two years later. In the Silver Age: JLA one-shot, the Injustice League discovered numerous shrunken alien cities found in Brainiac's abandoned spaceship.

==== Brainiac's updated mechanical form ====
Brainiac battles Superman during the Infinite Crisis event. Cover of Superman (vol. 2) #219 (September 2005). Art by Ed Benes.

Brainiac later reappeared as a swarm of interlinked nanotechnological units. Its operation was to sabotage a Waynetech research facility accomplished by infecting Metallo with a computer virus and controlling him from orbit. Superman and Batman tracked Brainiac's signal to an orbital facility and attacked. Brainiac's nanoswarm body was destroyed, though he had infected the Metal Men during their previous encounter with Metallo. Brainiac proceeded to use them to acquire a prototype OMAC unit, which Bruce Wayne developed using Brainiac 13's nanotechnology. Superman and Batman destroyed the OMAC body with the aid of the Metal Men, after the Metal Men overcame Brainiac's control.

==== Return ====
Following revisions to Superman's continuity in Infinite Crisis and Action Comics #850, Brainiac reappeared in a self-titled five-part story arc in Action Comics. In Action Comics #866 (August 2008), a Brainiac robot probe (resembling his skeleton-esque pre-Crisis incarnation, and mistaken for the real Brainiac by Clark) arrives on Earth and battles Superman. After the probe is defeated, information about Superman's blood is sent to the original Brainiac. As Brainiac wakes up, his computer announces "Attempt #242 in progress", a reference to Brainiac's first appearance in Action Comics #242, and to the many encounters between Brainiac and Superman. In the following issue, Supergirl reveals to Superman that Brainiac shrunk the Kryptonian city of Kandor and placed it in a bottle, and that all previous incarnations of Brainiac that Superman has encountered were just probes, clones, and nanite-controlled bodies. She notes that no one has ever actually seen Brainiac. Inspired by Supergirl's story, Superman attempts to find Brainiac and stop him. He heads to a world under attack by Brainiac just in time to be caught in a supernova as Brainiac destroys the system's star and the populated world along with it. The supernova knocks Superman out, and he is caught and brought onto Brainiac's ship.

Superman escapes from his imprisonment and sees Brainiac emerging from his "bio-shell". This version of Brainiac resembles a much larger and more muscular version of the original, pre-Crisis Brainiac, and has motives similar to the Superman: The Animated Series incarnation of the character in that he travels the universe and steals the knowledge of various alien cultures, abducting and shrinking cities from each planet as samples, and then destroys the planet so that the value of the destroyed civilization's knowledge is increased. Superman attacks Brainiac, but Brainiac manages to overpower the Man of Steel before restraining him with the help of his ship's internal systems. Brainiac inserts the subdued Superman into a machine that allows him to read the Kryptonian's mind, with the intent of assimilating his brain. Brainiac's ship then travels to Earth and prepares to abduct the city of Metropolis.

Brainiac successfully steals Metropolis, and prepares to fire a missile that will destroy the Sun and the Earth itself. Supergirl ends up captured along with the rest of Metropolis, but Superman breaks out of his restraints again and frees her. Supergirl stops the missile, while Superman battles Brainiac. Brainiac appears to have the advantage in physical combat yet again, but Superman knocks Brainiac out of his ship and into a swamp, where Brainiac is overwhelmed by the microscopic organisms covering his body. Superman uses this distraction to defeat Brainiac. While Superman frees the cities of Metropolis and Kandor, the villain launches a missile to the Kent farm in an act of spite. The farm is destroyed, and Jonathan Kent suffers a fatal heart attack because of it. Brainiac is brought to a top-secret military base, where the imprisoned Lex Luthor is assigned to discover his secrets. Luthor eventually manages to use Brainiac's connection to his ship to kill the soldiers assigned to watch him. Brainiac manages to free himself from Luthor's control, forcing him on board the ship, and the two make their escape.

Notably, upon learning of Brainiac's modus operandi of destroying planets by destabilizing nearby stars when he is done collecting cities and knowledge from said planets, Superman openly speculates that Brainiac destroyed Krypton, which was destroyed when its sun went nova soon after Brainiac abducted Kandor and Argo City. He also asks the alien what he did to Krypton's sun. Brainiac ignores the query, neither confirming or denying his responsibility, though he does heavily imply it. Superman still believes Brainiac had a part in Krypton's destruction after the end of this story arc.

==== New Krypton ====
Following this, Brainiac, now in possession of his ship again, unleashes his robot army against the newly created planet of New Krypton, and the Kryptonian citizens rise up to fight the drones. General Zod's army proves totally unable to fend them off, as the Brainiac's ship's force fields are seemingly invulnerable and his drones are equipped with red sun ray guns, allowing them to kill tens of thousands of Kryptonians. Superman, being the only one who knows how to penetrate his force fields (having learned the trick in the previous story arc), manages to enter Brainiac's ship. Supergirl leads the Kryptonians against the drones, but is attacked by an anti-Kryptonian Brainiac probe. Superboy, Mon-El, and the Legion of Super-Heroes join the fight and save Supergirl.

After this, Brainiac shrinks Kandor again and re-bottles it, including a miniature red sun to de-power all the Kryptonians inside. The Legion, Supergirl, Superboy, Zod, and Superman all make it on to Brainiac's ship, thanks to Brainiac 5 hacking his ancestor's force fields and allowing them entry. The Legion explains to Zod that, just as Krypton's city of Kandor is held in a bottle onboard Brainiac's ship, other planets' cities are also imprisoned, and, therefore, Zod cannot destroy Brainiac's ship until the cities can be rescued. Zod sends Supergirl off and then arrests the Legionnaires, branding them terrorists. Meanwhile, Superman is about to face off against Brainiac when he is knocked down by a kryptonite energy blast fired by Lex Luthor and subsequently captured. Brainiac locks him in captivity with the intent to experiment on him, but Superman escapes and meets up with the rest of the superheroes and Zod on a separate section of the ship. Zod enters the scene and engages Brainiac in combat while Supergirl, Superboy, and the Legion recover the bottled cities on Brainiac's ship, including Kandor. Zod seems to be losing his fight with Brainiac, when suddenly Superman gets up and tackles Brainiac from behind. Before the battle between the two Kryptonians and the villain can continue, Brainiac's ship starts to destabilize and descend towards the planet. It is revealed that Luthor sabotaged the ship and re-sized one of the cities while inside.

Luthor's intervention causes the ship to crash into New Krypton, destroying it while Supergirl and the Legion re-size Kandor. However, the city that Luthor expanded is still growing, now putting Kandor at risk. As Brainiac 5 works on the problem, Supergirl is shocked to discover Superman impaled by pieces of Brainiac's ship as a result of the explosion. Superman appears to have been fatally stricken. Luthor, though reeling from the explosion, is pleased with all the destruction he has caused. Brainiac confronts Luthor in the ruins of the ship and is furious that Luthor sabotaged his ship. Luthor mocks him and spits in his eye before Brainiac angrily snaps Luthor's neck, killing him.

Now deprived of his ship and technology, and seemingly depowered by his ship's destruction, Brainiac finds himself faced by an entire city of angry, solar-powered Kryptonians. Zod is eager for a final showdown with Brainiac, who calls Zod a coward for confronting Brainiac with his powers intact and an army of super-powered Kryptonians at his back. In response, Zod fires the red sun radiation from an Archer rifle at himself, to remove his powers and thus supposedly level the playing field as he prepares to take Brainiac down. Brainiac 5 gives Superman a transfusion of Conner Kent's blood and exposes him to a large dose of concentrated yellow sun rays, successfully reviving him.

Despite the loss of his powers, Zod is able to get the upper hand on the similarly powerless Brainiac and force him to his knees. Zod is about to shoot Brainiac when Superman intervenes. This causes a heated argument between Superman and Zod. Zod commands his soldiers to restrain Kal-El so Zod can proceed with the execution of Brainiac. Brainiac 5, sensing that this is his moment of destiny, steps in and teleports himself and Brainiac off of New Krypton.

It is revealed that Lex Luthor used a Luthor robot, supplied by Toyman, to accomplish his mission on New Krypton, and that Brainiac killed the robot instead. Luthor discusses with Sam Lane how his objective, to bring chaos to New Krypton, was achieved. Luthor has been working as an agent of General Lane all along. The disarray that Luthor caused provides Lane with a window of opportunity as he prepares for the impending war with New Krypton. Luthor receives a presidential pardon for his efforts. The story ends with Zod rallying his people as he declares war on the planet Earth. The story concludes in the miniseries Superman: War of the Supermen.

Mon-El plants the many bottled cities that Brainiac has captured over the years on various planets across the galaxy. These cities will one day become the United Planets by the 31st century, the same planets that will produce the members of the Legion of Super-Heroes.

Brainiac 5 takes Brainiac to their homeworld of Colu where he hands him over to Vril Dox, a.k.a. Brainiac 2. Vril happily turns his "father" over to his people for his crimes. Lyrl Dox, a.k.a. Brainiac 3, releases his "grandfather" with a weapon called Pulsar Stargrave. What then occurs is an all-out battle for Colu between all three present-day Brainiacs. Vril even calls in Lobo for help. Brainiac breaks out of his prison and, after causing much damage on Colu, escapes with Stargrave in tow for parts unknown.

=== The New 52 ===
Brainiac's origin in "The New 52" is revealed in Superman #23.2. Vril Dox was acknowledged as the greatest scientist on his homeworld, Yod-Colu, due to his advances in force field technology and miniaturization. He developed an artificial intelligence, C.O.M.P.U.T.O., allowing him to discover the fifth dimension. Dox discovered the fifth dimension was in a state of war, and a group of its inhabitants, the Multitude, had entered their dimension and destroyed over a hundred planets. Realizing Yod-Colu was next in the Multitude's path, Dox tried to find a way to save his planet, even performing experiments on his son. The magistrates of Yod-Colu sentenced Dox to exile, but Dox used C.O.M.P.U.T.O. to take control of Yod-Colu's computer networks. Copying the planet's database, Dox constructed an army of robot servants called Terminauts and miniaturized the city his wife and son lived on and bottled it in a force field, while the rest of Yod-Colu was destroyed by the Multitude.

After the destruction of Yod-Colu, Dox constructed an army of starships and distributed his consciousness across a series of robots that would each travel the universe to preserve planets from the Multitude, becoming known as the Collector of Worlds. One of these robots attacked Krypton. Dox became fascinated by Jor-El, a Kryptonian scientist who actually saved his homeworld from the Multitude. Upon returning to Krypton, however, Dox discovered Krypton had been destroyed.

Referred to at first as 'The Collector of Worlds', Brainiac is first seen as the mysterious informant that supplies Lex Luthor information of Superman and his alien nature. Clark is having a dream of Krypton's final moments in which an artificial intelligence that controls the planet wakes up robots in an attempt to preserve the Kryptonian culture. Later, while Clark conducts an interview in a robotic factory, the same harvester robots appear.

John Corben (the soon-to-be supervillain Metallo) is suddenly possessed by the artificial intelligence, which demands to see Superman. The robots create havoc throughout Metropolis, but Superman soon realizes that they are really after him. Superman fights the possessed Corben with the help of John Henry Irons.

Although they managed to defeat him, the alien sentience had already miniaturized and bottled the city of Metropolis and took it to his ship in space. Superman travels to the ship to find many alien bottled cities, Kandor included. The alien identifies himself as a being from the planet Colu where he was known as C.O.M.P.U.T.O and on Krypton he was called Brainiac 1.0. He claims that, without Superman and the ship that brought him to Earth, his Kryptonian collection is incomplete. The alien intelligence demands Superman make a choice: the intelligence will disable life support in both the Kandor and Metropolis bottles, and Superman must choose which city to save using indestructible Kryptonian armor found on the ship.

Superman decides on neither and wears the armor (which changes instantly into the current Superman costume design). Brainiac sends Metallo to attack Superman, but due to Superman reasoning with him over his feelings for Lois Lane, he breaks free of Brainiac's control and joins Superman in his attack. Superman then uses his rocket from Krypton which had also been miniaturized with Metropolis to attack Brainiac's mind, which the rocket was able to do since its primary mission was to protect Kal-El. In doing so, Metropolis was returned to Earth and Superman took possession of Brainiac's ship and made it his new super citadel.

Notably, the ship Clark was placed into as a child was described as having "Brainiac AI", leaving the identity of the Collector of Worlds in doubt. The Colony of the Collector of Worlds told Superman that its AI technology went by different names, beginning on Yod-Colu as C.O.M.P.U.T.O. On Noma, he was called Pneumenoid; on Bryak it was Mind2; on Krypton he was called Brainiac 1.0; and, finally on Earth, he is the Internet.

After this defeat, Brainiac retreated to deeper parts of the cosmos, and eventually came across the planet Tolerance, the setting of a bounty hunting glimmernet game show called The Hunted. Striking a deal with Lady Styx, overlord of the Tenebrian Dominion, he bottles a portion of the Sh'diki Borough of Tolerance to add to his collection. He encounters Jediah Caul, a former member of the Green Lantern Corps, who combats and infects Brainiac's ship. Ultimately, Brainiac abandons his plans with the Sh'diki Borough and ejects Caul and the bottled city before leaving for parts unknown.

Back on Earth, during an investigation of 20 kidnapped people who developed metahuman powers after being kidnapped by Brainiac, one of these 20 infects Lois Lane, thereby giving Brainiac control over a close ally of Superman. Brainiac plots his return to Earth, using Lane to infiltrate Earth's defense systems to allow an easier path for his physical return. and even upgrading her body to contain his 12th level intelligence. His minion Cyborg Superman (a reconstructed Zor-El, father of Supergirl) constructs a portal to allow Brainiac's command ship and "daughter ships" to travel to Earth from throughout the galaxy.

Superman, whom Brainiac had conspired to 'infect' with the monster Doomsday to drive him away from Earth, uses his augmented power to attack Brainiac's gigantic mothership and break through to its core and, finally, Vril Dox himself. The Coluan appears still-humanoid, and explains his reasoning for stealing minds from throughout the universe: he has concluded that if he can 'unite' the minds of a certain critical number of people, he will be able to change reality itself. His motivation for this appears a desire to right the wrongs he feels responsible for: the loss of his wife and child back on Colu. His plan is undone when Superman drags him, mothership and all, into a black hole. Dox is snatched away to safety by a being who appears to be the true Brainiac: an immensely powerful entity from outside the universe itself.

=== Convergence ===
This version of Brainiac, a composite of Brainiac from around the Multiverse, is revealed to be the pre-Flashpoint era Brainiac who, having found his way into the Source Wall and into the Multiverse, was thrown back in the timestream and mutated by the effects of "crisis" events such as Crisis on Infinite Earths, Zero Hour, and 52, creating a godlike being. He then uncovered the location of Vanishing Point from nearly killing New 52 Earth-0's Michelle Carter, from which he could roam the complete history of the Multiverse, collecting doomed cities from defunct timelines, alternative futures, and parallel worlds to add to his collection, in Convergence, leaving behind an agent, Telos, to rule a planet of the same name containing the cities. Brainiac's attempt to do this to a future timeline of Earth-0 was narrowly averted by the heroes in the story The New 52: Futures End; Brainiac was contained in a T-sphere, leaving Telos stranded without his master, prompting the events of Convergence in which the planets are bid to fight each other. When the events of Convergence nearly end in an irreversible destruction of the Multiverse, the time traveller Waverider, formerly the pre-Flashpoint Booster Gold, frees Brainiac, who reveals he is sick from his mutations and only wishes to return to normal, to being Brainiac of Colu. He sends most of the heroes home, and with help from the Zero Hour Parallax and the pre-Flashpoint Superman, averts the collapse of the Multiverse from Crisis on Infinite Earths, and is returned to the normal Brainiac. His actions also allow various parallel universes and alternate timelines to exist as the new Multiverse.

=== DC Rebirth ===
In 2016, DC Comics implemented another relaunch of its books called "DC Rebirth" which restored its continuity to a form much as it was prior to "The New 52". Brainiac's name is first referenced in an issue of Hal Jordan and the Green Lantern Corps. The entirety of the Green and Yellow Lanterns (including Hal Jordan, Guy Gardner, and John Stewart), along with Starro, are lured into a trap and shrunken. In the next issue, they are trapped in a bottle, and their jailer is revealed to be a robot claiming to run on "Brainiac 2.0" software. The robot resembles both Brainiac's 1983 skeleton-esque incarnation and the robotic drones utilized by the post-2008 version of Brainiac. It has a collection of shrunken bottled planets, and travels in a ship resembling Brainiac's skullship. At the time, it was not clear if this was the true Brainiac after Rebirth or yet another one of his drones.

The machine's victory is short-lived, however, as it is revealed that Larfleeze was able to reprogram it to his side using an Orange Lantern ring, having rebooted its life systems after finding it inactive on his homeworld with its ship. Larfleeze is impressed that the machine was able to capture the Green Lanterns and Starro, and even more impressed with the machine's shrinking technology, and plans to hijack its technology to put together his own collection. He takes the ship and collection to his homeworld of Okaara. However, upon being informed that the Yellow and Green Lanterns are still fighting inside the bottle and trying to kill each other, Larfleeze's greed gets the best of him and he ends up breaking the container. This frees the Lanterns, and somehow restores them to their normal size and strength, after which they immediately start rampaging inside the ship and trashing Brainiac/Larfleeze's collection. Hal, Kyle, John, and Guy go on to lead the attack on the Orange Lantern Corps. With everyone fighting together, the Orange Lantern Corps are quickly overwhelmed. Larfleeze accuses the robot of playing him; when it responds that it simply did what he programmed it to do, Larfleeze destroys it in a rage.

The Superman storyline "New World" later confirmed via a flashback cameo that the post-Crisis, post-2008 version of Brainiac still exists in the post-Rebirth continuity, and has encountered Superman in the past. The robot that Larfleeze destroyed was one of his drones.

==== No Justice ====
Brainiac later arrived on Earth again and battled the Justice League, who proved no match for him and his ship, until Superman arrived. However, he did not come to destroy the Earth, but to deliver a warning: that there is a cosmic-level threat in the universe coming to Earth, one that the heroes of Earth are woefully ill-prepared for. Brainiac thinks he can defeat the threat, but it means teaming up with Superman and the Justice League and combining members of the League with some of the most dangerous supervillains in the DC Universe and sending them into battle against this extinction-level menace. Four teams outfitted with Brainiac's technology are formed (including among other members, Lex Luthor, Batman, Wonder Woman, and Sinestro), with Brainiac himself working directly alongside his nemesis, Superman.

The No Justice miniseries begins with the Omega Titans, the aforementioned threat, attacking Colu, Brainiac's homeworld, which explains Brainiac's kidnapping of Earth's superheroes and supervillains. Brainiac claims to have developed a plan to defeat the Omega Titans and the superheroes only need to follow his orders to win, but Amanda Waller uses the hidden Protocol XI, which involves kidnapping the world's most dangerous psychics, to probe Brainiac's mind and find out what he knows. The strain of the psychic attack causes Brainiac's head to explode, apparently killing him. His clone-son, Vril Dox/Brainiac II, later revealed that if Brainiac's plan had been followed, he would have hijacked the power of the Titans himself, destroyed Earth, and conquered Colu before going on to dominate the universe.

==== Legion of Doom ====
Brainiac's body is later recovered by Lex Luthor, who sets Professor Ivo on reconstructing it with the intention of the alien joining the Legion of Doom. He initially tries to betray the Legion soon after awakening, but Luthor is able to convince him that they are better off working together after a linking of their minds. The Legion's plan revolves around reviving and empowering a cosmic being named Perpetua. Brainiac aids them in this goal, and as a result is able to go around the multiverse and bottle "hypertime", essentially entirely different timelines. Confronting the Justice League in the 853rd century, Brainiac uses the knowledge and technology of these hundreds of advanced timelines to upgrade himself into Brainiac One Million, a colossal new form possessing unparalleled power. He plans to destroy the timelines he had abducted after completing his battle, to keep his knowledge exclusive, boasting that when this iteration of the multiverse dies, he alone will have its knowledge. Multiple alternate Justice Leagues from across the universe prove unable to defeat him even working together. However, when Perpetua is finally revived at full power, even his abilities prove nothing compared to her nigh-omnipotence, and she decides to use it to turn him into her new control station/throne, effectively subverting him into a tool.

==== Brainiac 6 ====
Brainiac 6 and other members of the "gang" first appear in Adventures of the Super Sons #1.

==== Dawn of DC ====
Brainiac has placed Lobo's city in a bottle because he believes that city will allow him to uncover Earth's greatest secret. He then launches an invasion in Metropolis and captures most of Superman's powered allies and Lex Luthor, with Superman unable to stop him. It is also revealed that Brainiac is seemingly dying, and has created clones to help him with his tasks. Brainiac frees Luthor to hear his explanation on how he can bring Superman, and plans to experiment on Lana Lang. Brainiac convinces General Chacal, a Czarnian general, to capture Superman, and sacrifices the Czarnians so that Brainiac Queen can get more power. Luthor realizes Brainiac has been losing his intelligence and dying due to him creating new bodies across the multiverse and splitting his consciousness into them, causing strain in his body. Conner Kent uses his telekinesis to deactivate Brainiac Queen and weaken Brainiac's ship while Luthor deactivates Brainiac's core mind. Superman realizes Brainiac has been experiencing emotions for the first time and has been trying to create a family so he can feel love. Brainiac persuades Superman to save his city, while he warps Brainiac Queen away and is seemingly killed when his ship explodes.

== Powers, abilities, and equipment ==
Brainiac's most consistent power (endemic to all versions) is his twelfth-level intelligence, allowing calculation abilities, enhanced memory, and advanced understanding of mechanical engineering, bioengineering, physics, and as well as other theoretical and applied sciences. For comparison, the population of 20th century Earth constitutes a sixth-level intelligence, while the population of 31st-century Earth are a ninth-level intelligence. His post-Crisis incarnation claims that his brain can process and sort knowledge of over four hundred ninety octodecillion beings (4.9 × 10^{59}), which is an enormous number, about five billion times the estimated number of atoms on Earth. All the different versions have created devices such as a force field belt capable of withstanding Superman's most powerful blows, and a shrink ray capable of reducing cities.

Brainiac's advanced mental powers have shown him capable of possessing others, absorbing information from other beings, transferring his consciousness, creating and manipulating computer systems, replicating duplicate bodies for himself, and exerting powers to traverse or control spacetime. Among organic beings, Brainiac views only his frequent partner Lex Luthor as a peer intellect. Brainiac is usually depicted with incredibly high levels of strength, durability, and speed; the exact level varies, but usually hovers at around Superman's strength. Brainiac's exact abilities vary drastically throughout his various incarnations.

=== Pre-Crisis abilities ===
Originally, Brainiac was a scientist with no superhuman abilities aside from his intellect. He fought Superman via the use of his advanced technology and cunning, similar to Lex Luthor. Among these were a force field belt that protects him from all harm, a shrink ray to capture and bottle cities (even Metropolis), and a headpiece consisting of a cluster of diode/electrode-like objects. His cybernetic headpiece lets him interface with technology and discharge energy blasts from his head, which were powerful enough to significantly harm Superman. The Man of Steel described these blasts as "blindingly painful... almost unbearable" and a threat to his life. When the Crisis on Infinite Earths struck, Brainiac could detect the lies of others by reading their thoughts. The pre-Crisis Brainiac was referred to by an omniscient narrator as "the super-computer space pirate-- Superman's most powerful nemesis."

Brainiac as an unpowered being reliant on external weaponry was largely still the case even after he was retconned as an android, but in the 1980s, everything changed. This was when he gained the abilities that would persist through all subsequent incarnations: super-physical attributes, intelligence, and technopathy. His technopathic abilities extend to control of his ship, with which he shares a symbiotic relationship. He is capable of downloading his consciousness to spare robotic bodies in the event the original is destroyed or damaged. Brainiac can also possess organic beings under certain circumstances, as he did to Luthor during Whatever Happened to the Man of Tomorrow?.

The final body utilized by the pre-Crisis Brainiac (resembling a robotic skeleton) was technopathic, superhumanly strong, and resilient, and was capable of generating and "spinning" psychokinetic energies into a web-like net which could hold even Superman at bay. Among the knowledge he absorbed was extensive information of hand-to-hand combat techniques, making him a highly skilled combatant. Despite this, he saw physical confrontation as beneath him, and preferred to defeat foes with his mind.

=== Post-Crisis abilities ===
==== Probes ====
John Byrne's re-imagining of the character has telepathy and telekinesis, as well as extensive knowledge of various alien technologies. He was an artificial intelligence who had inhabited the body of a human psychic and awakened his powers, further enhancing them with an implanted electrode headpiece. His vast psychic powers allowed him to seriously challenge Superman and defeat many members of the New Gods (including Orion) with a single blast, but this body's lack of durability is the major liability and eventually led to it being rendered useless in a gasoline explosion. After the organic body was destroyed, his consciousness built and possessed multiple robotic bodies, and occasionally hijacks other organic bodies (such as Doomsday's). His abilities were dependent on the body he was inhabiting at the time, in which could vary from weak as normal to far stronger than abnormal. His nanoswarm incarnation, known as Brainiac 2.5 for instance, can shapeshift, regenerate, bend technology to his whim, project energy blasts and force fields, and match Superman blow for blow; Superman stated Brainiac to have physical strength on par with Doomsday in this form. His strongest incarnation was Brainiac 13, who, even prior to absorbing Imperiex, was so physically formidable that Superman cannot remotely affect, much less damage him. By contrast, Brainiac could easily kill Superman in a short time, if he had not been devoted to torturing the Man of Steel.

==== True form ====
It was later revealed that this version of Brainiac (like the previous ones) is merely a mentally-controlled probe. The real Brainiac, who was a living Coluan, had both genetically and cybernetically modified himself. This Brainiac lacked psychic powers, but still has abilities identical to his original incarnations. He possesses a level of strength and durability far greater than Superman; capable of easily overpowering the Kryptonian in unarmed combat, and can withstand several consecutive blows to the face from Superman without visible harm. His speed is vastly surpassing, so fast that he even once caught a punch thrown by the Man of Steel. At one point, Brainiac 5 warns Superman that he would most likely die against Brainiac in a straight fight.

Despite his massive biomechanical modifications, Brainiac does have a few weaknesses. Like the pre-Crisis Brainiac, he is telepathically linked to his ship in such way that being separated from it without warning can neutralize him temporarily. However, prolonged periods cause him to physically deteriorate and become less powerful; Lex Luthor observed this while studying his unconscious body over course of several days when it was in custody of the U.S. government. Initially, he was only overloaded in particularly dirty environments and human society via mysophobia while landing into the Earth's atmosphere. However, Brainiac does not seem to possess this defect in his later battles, such as when he defeats Superboy.

Brainiac is an incredibly experienced fighter, but like his pre-Crisis counterpart is most dangerous due to the advanced technology he wields, much of it of his own invention. These include his classic shrink ray and force field belt, and other gadgets such as missiles capable of causing stars to go into a premature supernova state. His force fields are so impregnable that a direct hit from an energy weapon killed several solar-powered Kryptonians and did not leave so much as a single scratch on his ship. Brainiac also possesses an army of at least ten thousand humanoid robotic "probes". These probes are strong enough to draw blood from Superman and tough enough to withstand his most powerful blows. During the New Krypton story arc, Brainiac upgraded his drones with red-sun ray guns for the purpose of fighting fully powered Kryptonians. When Brainiac orders them to attack New Krypton, they quickly kill over eleven thousand Kryptonians.

He is a bionically engineered cyborg who wants to acquire more knowledge and become "better". With his ship, twelfth-level intellect, and powerful technology, Brainiac has captured a thousand cities, absorbed all the information, and destroyed many worlds.

=== The New 52 abilities ===
Brainiac, in The New 52, seems to have kept most of the powers and equipment of his post-Crisis incarnation (including his shrink ray, force field belt, and robot army), with notable additions. Brainiac's ship has been massively upgraded in this incarnation; it is now larger than the entire planetary system, and carries within a huge invasion fleet of smaller ships in numerous types. He still appears to possess the physical strength, near-invulnerability, and fast speed of his post-Crisis counterpart, as shown when he easily defeats Zor-El. By the Superman: Doomed story arc, Brainiac utilizes his vast intellect to become a powerful psychic, augmented by the alien minds that he had stolen and digitized from across every galaxy. Then, he is capable of taking control of eight billion minds on Earth at the same time. He also demonstrates considerable mental abilities, claiming that their combined brainwaves throughout the universe can allow him to alter reality at will. He plans on using this newfound power to remake it into own his image. However, Brainiac's plan prematurely ended when Superman battles him telepathically and crashes his ship into a black hole.

Following the Doomed story arc, it is further revealed that this pre-Crisis Brainiac somehow escaped and mutated from the Crisis on Infinite Earths itself ever since. Becoming a god-like being, this version of Brainiac is virtually omnipotent with the ability to warp universes and time travel. Using this New 52 incarnation as one of his probes, he either created or interacted with different iterations of himself throughout the whole multiverse. Brainiac has grown so much in power that he can collect cities from other universes at will. At the end of the Convergence story arc, he recreates the DC Multiverse.

== Reception ==
In 2009, IGN ranked Brainiac 17th in their "Top 100 Comic Book Villains" list.

== Other versions ==
- Galactiac, a composite character based on Brainiac and Marvel Comics character Galactus appears in the Amalgam Comics story Challengers of the Fantastic.
- Brainiac's Daughter, the child of Brainiac and Matrix, appears in Kingdom Come as a member of Superman's Justice League. Additionally, Brainiac appears in the tie-in The Kingdom: Son of the Bat #1.
- An anti-matter universe version of Brainiac appears in JLA: Earth 2. This version is an organic lifeform trapped in a tank. Pretending to serve under Ultraman, he manipulates the Crime Syndicate and Justice League into trapping themselves within each other's worlds. However, the League foil his plot before allowing the Syndicate to defeat him.
- An alternate universe version of Brainiac appears in The Dark Knight Strikes Again. Years after Lex Luthor blackmailed various heroes into retiring or acting as his servants, Brainiac works with him to keep Kandor contained and use it as leverage against Superman. However, Superman and Wonder Woman's daughter Lara and the Atom join forces to destroy Kandor's bottle. Using their newly acquired powers, the freed Kandorians destroy Brainiac.
- An alternate universe version of Brainiac appears in JLA: Shogun of Steel.
- A Bizarro Brainiac appears in Supergirl and the Legion of Super-Heroes #30, in which he expands a city in Antarctica to create Big City.
- An alternate timeline version of Brainiac appears in the Flashpoint tie-in Kid Flash Lost #1. This version is the ruler of Earth in the 31st century.
- An alternate universe version of Brainiac appears in Justice League/Mighty Morphin Power Rangers. After the titular Mighty Morphin Power Rangers and their enemy Lord Zedd accidentally teleport themselves to the DC Universe, the latter strikes a deal with Brainiac. While he uses an army of monsters to distract the Justice League, Brainiac steals the Rangers' powers and travels to their world to steal a city from there. However, the League and Rangers join forces to pursue Brainiac, regain the latter's powers, and eventually defeat him.
- An alternate universe version of Brainiac appears in Superman: Red Son. This version is an alien AI who comes to Earth in 1978 to work with Lex Luthor before being defeated and seemingly reprogrammed by Superman. Having used his twelfth-level intellect to bypass the reprogramming, Brainiac pretends to loyally serve under Superman for the next four decades before eventually betraying him and being defeated once more.
- An alternate universe version of Brainiac appears in Absolute Superman. This version was created by the Brainiac Collective as a low-level worker, built solely for the task of shoveling deceased Brainiacs into a ship's furnace. Over the years, he gradually went insane from the prolonged isolation and eventually escaped, only to find the other Brainiacs aboard dead. He went on to collect and bottle cities across the universe before traveling to Earth. In the present, he began working for Ra's al Ghul and the Lazarus Corporation until Superman defeats Ra's, after which Brainiac leaves Lazarus to find Lex Luthor.

== In other media ==
=== Television ===
==== Live-action ====
- Brainiac appears in Smallville, portrayed by James Marsters. This version is the BRAIN InterActive Construct, a Kryptonian nano-supercomputer created by Dax-Ur and Jor-El that is corrupted by Major Zod into destabilizing Krypton's core. Introduced in the fifth season, Brainiac arrives on Earth and assumes the identity of "Milton Fine", a history professor at Central Kansas A&M University, in a failed attempt to manipulate Clark Kent into releasing Zod from the Phantom Zone. Brainiac returns in the seventh and eighth seasons before being defeated, taken to the future, and reprogrammed by the Legion of Super-Heroes as Brainiac 5 by the tenth season.
  - An alternate universe version of Brainiac appears in the episode "Apocalypse" as the White House Chief of Staff under President Lex Luthor.
- Brainiac appears in Krypton, portrayed by Blake Ritson. This version is a Coluan cyborg who takes over the mind of Krypton's religious leader, the Voice of Rao. Brainiac's design was realized through a combination of extensive makeup, prosthetics and CGI.
- Milton "Brainiac" Fine appears in Superman & Lois, portrayed by Nikolai Witschl. This version is a human computer engineer working for Lex Luthor.

==== Animation ====
- Brainiac appears in The New Adventures of Superman, voiced by Cliff Owens.
- Brainiac appears in the Super Friends franchise, voiced by Ted Cassidy and later Stanley Ralph Ross. This version is a member of the Legion of Doom.

Brainiac in the DC Animated Universe

- Brainiac appears in the DC Animated Universe (DCAU), voiced by Corey Burton.
  - Introduced in Superman: The Animated Series, this version is a Kryptonian supercomputer who dismisses Jor-El's warnings of Krypton's imminent destruction so that he can secretly save himself and escape, after which he travels to other planets and assimilates their information before destroying them, believing their knowledge to be most valuable in his sole possession. Additionally, a future version of Brainiac from the year 2979 travels back in time to kill Clark Kent before he can become Superman, only to be thwarted by the Legion of Super-Heroes.
  - Brainiac appears in the Justice League two-part episode "Twilight". He forms an alliance with Darkseid to defeat Superman and the Justice League, but they are both killed when Brainiac's asteroid headquarters implodes.
  - Brainiac appears in the Static Shock two-part episode "A League of Their Own". One of his circuit boards contained in the Justice League's Watchtower is reactivated by a cosmic storm, allowing him to take control of the facility and brainwash Gear and the League, but Static manages to stop him.
  - Brainiac appears in Justice League Unlimited. It is revealed that he planted a copy of himself in Luthor's body during the events of Superman: The Animated Series, which laid dormant for years while influencing Luthor's actions, curing his Kryptonite cancer, and giving him super-strength. Brainiac manipulates Luthor into creating a duplicate body of Amazo for himself. When Amanda Waller and the Justice League foil his plan, Brainiac merges with Luthor using the Dark Heart in Cadmus' possession, but the Flash purges Brainiac from Luthor's body. Brainiac survives in Luthor's consciousness, leading to Luthor obsessively attempting to revive him, only to inadvertently resurrect Darkseid instead.
- Brainiac appears in Legion of Super Heroes (2006), voiced again by Corey Burton.
- Brainiac appears in Robot Chicken.
- Brainiac appears in Batman: The Brave and the Bold, voiced by Richard McGonagle.
- Brainiac appears in Teen Titans Go!, voiced by Jeff Bennett.
- An alternate universe version of Brainiac appears in the Justice League: Gods and Monsters Chronicles episode "Bomb", voiced by Tara Strong. This version is a child-like android with psychic powers created by Doctor Sivana.
- Brainiac appears in Justice League Action, voiced by John de Lancie.
- Brainiac appears in My Adventures with Superman, voiced by Michael Emerson, for the first time in season 2. This version is a psychotic A.I. who previously controlled all aspects of the Kryptonian Empire before he destroyed it when they considered peace talks, which would lead to him being shut down. Left with the space station Kandor, he works to rebuild the Empire by conquering other planets and destroying those that refuse to accept his rule. Additionally, he raised Kara Zor-El and brainwashed her to serve as his second-in-command until she eventually breaks free of his control. Bringing the space station Kandor to Earth, he tries to conquer it, only to be met by heavy resistance. In one final attempt to defeat both Superman and Supergirl, he attempts a kamikaze attack against both heroes, where Supergirl destroys his body, but salvages his core. In season 3, it is revealed that Brainiac was among the Coluans who were enslaved and transferred into robotic bodies to serve the Kryptonian empire, with the Brainiac who raised Supergirl being different from them.
- Brainiac appears in Harley Quinn, voiced by Stephen Fry. This version was an information and technology collector of other worlds for the Coluan government who had an unnamed wife and a son named Vril II. Having been promoted to a position that no longer required traveling, his last mission was to obtain a shrinking weapon, the Hyper-Ray, from an uninhabited planet. After successfully returning home with it, he was devastated to find that Colu's entire population has been destroyed, including his family. Blaming himself for not calculating the planet's minimal imperfections, he spent several years traveling the galaxy, shrinking and collecting civilizations that he perfected.

=== Film ===
==== Live-action ====
- There have been many attempts to bring Brainiac into a live-action film that did not come into fruition. A planned film titled Superman Reborn was set to star Brainiac as the villain. Brainiac was also set to be the main antagonist in Tim Burton's Superman Lives. He was also considered to appear in the Superman Returns sequel. Zack Snyder planned to use Brainiac in the sequel to Man of Steel, while screenwriter Steven Knight wrote a treatment of the film that included Brainiac as the antagonist.
- Brainiac will appear in the DC Universe (DCU) film Man of Tomorrow (2027), portrayed by Lars Eidinger.

==== Animation ====
- Brainiac appears in Superman: Brainiac Attacks (2006), voiced by Lance Henriksen.
- Brainiac appears in Superman: Unbound (2013), voiced by John Noble. This version possesses cybernetic and genetic enhancements as well as a ship designed to interface with and act as an extension of his body.
- Brainiac makes a cameo appearance in Lego Batman: The Movie - DC Super Heroes Unite (2013), voiced by Troy Baker.
- Brainiac appears in Lego DC Comics Super Heroes: Justice League: Cosmic Clash (2016), voiced by Phil LaMarr.
- Brainiac appears in DC Super Hero Girls: Intergalactic Games (2017), voiced by Fred Tatasciore.
- Brainiac appears in Superman: Red Son (2020), voiced by Paul Williams.
- Brainiac appears in films set in the Tomorrowverse, voiced by Darin De Paul. This version is the founder of the Dark Circle and wields Kryptonite bullets.
  - Brainiac appears in Justice Society: World War II (2021).
  - Brainiac appears in Legion of Super-Heroes (2023).
- Brainiac makes a non-speaking appearance in Scooby-Doo! and Krypto, Too!.

=== Video games ===
- Brainiac appears in Superman: The Man of Steel (1989), voiced by Eric Francis.
- Brainiac appears as the final boss of Superman (1992).
- Brainiac appears as the final boss of and a playable character in Superman 64 (1999).
- Brainiac 13 appears as the final boss of Superman: The Man of Steel (2002).
- Brainiac appears as a boss in Justice League Heroes (2006), voiced by Peter Jessop.
- Brainiac appears as a boss in the Nintendo DS version of Superman Returns (2006).
- Brainiac appears in DC Universe Online (2011), voiced again by Corey Burton.
- Brainiac appears as a support card in the mobile version of Injustice: Gods Among Us (2013).
- Brainiac appears as a boss and character summon in Scribblenauts Unmasked: A DC Comics Adventure (2013).
- Brainiac appears as the final boss of and a playable character in Injustice 2 (2017), voiced by Jeffrey Combs.
- Brainiac appears as the final boss of Suicide Squad: Kill the Justice League (2024), voiced by Jason Isaacs. He joins forces with 13 of his multiversal doppelgängers to brainwash or capture his Earth's Justice League and conquer the multiverse, only to be opposed by his Earth's Suicide Squad.

==== Lego series ====
- Brainiac appears as a boss and playable character in Lego Batman 2: DC Super Heroes (2012), voiced by Troy Baker.
- Brainiac appears as a playable character in Lego Batman 3: Beyond Gotham (2014), voiced by Dee Bradley Baker.
- Brainiac makes a cameo appearance in Lego Dimensions (2015), voiced again by Dee Bradley Baker via archival recordings.
- Brainiac appears as a playable character in Lego DC Super-Villains (2018).

=== Miscellaneous ===
- Brainiac appears in the novel The Last Days of Krypton, by Kevin J. Anderson.
- Brainiac appears in the Young Justice tie-in comic.
- Brainiac appears in Legion of Super Heroes in the 31st Century #9.
- Brainiac appears in Superman '78. This version is a Coluan cyborg. After coming to Earth and deeming Superman a threat to its ecosystem, Brainiac fights him, threatening to destroy Metropolis. When Superman surrenders, Brainiac shrinks him and imprisons him within Kandor, but Lex Luthor contacts Superman, leading to Brainiac deeming humanity a threat to themselves and mounting an attempt to shrink Metropolis. However, Superman receives aid from his birth parents in escaping and thwarting the plot. Brainiac dons a powered suit to fight him once more, but is defeated and dies amidst his ship's destruction while Superman recovers the bottled cities within.

== Etymology ==
A toy computer called Brainiac was introduced in 1958 by Edmund Berkeley, developed as a new model of the Geniac. The Brainiac character being introduced the same year was attributed by a DC editor to a "remarkable coincidence." The product was given as the reason for the character's 1964 shift in portrayal to a "computer personality."
