= Digi-Comp I =

Mechanical computer

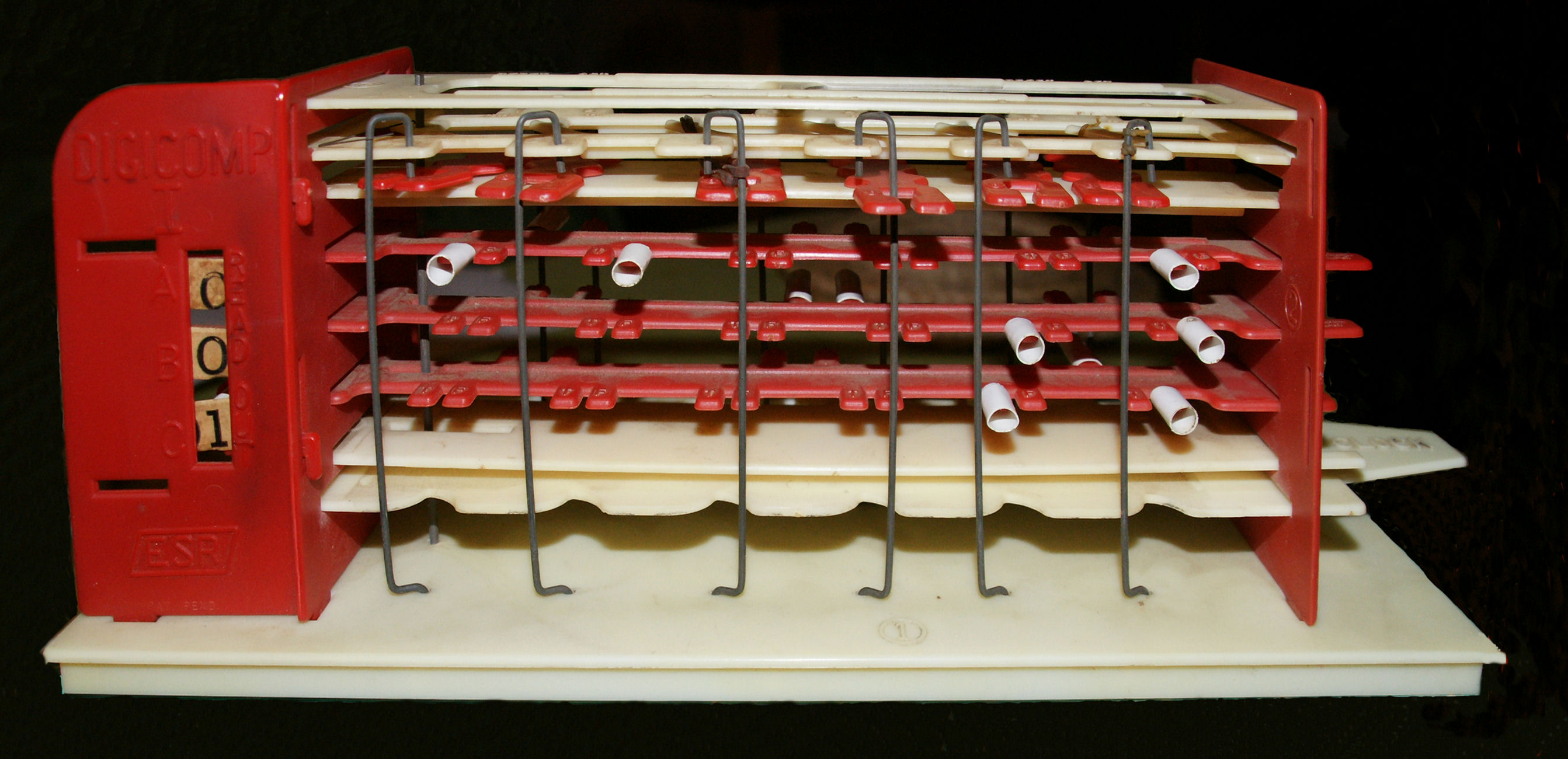
The original DigiComp I

The Digi-Comp I is a functioning, mechanical digital computer sold in kit form. It was originally manufactured from polystyrene parts by E.S.R., Inc. starting in 1963 and sold as an educational toy for US$4.99 (equivalent to US$52 in 2025).

The Digi-Comp I has been referred to as the first home computer.

A successor, the Digi-Comp II, is not programmable, but in effect a visible calculator. A two-level Masonite platform with guides serves as the medium for a supply of marbles that rolled down an inclined plane, moving plastic cams as they fell.

== Operation ==
The Digi-Comp I contains three mechanical flip-flops, providing an ability to connect them together in a programmable way using thin vertical wires that are either pushed, or blocked from moving, by a number of cylindrical pegs. The whole arrangement is "clocked" by moving a lever back and forth. Different configurations of these cylinders cause the Digi-Comp to compute different Boolean logic operations. With a three binary digit (3-bit) readout of the state of the flip-flops, it could be programmed to demonstrate binary logic, to perform various operations such as addition and subtraction, and to play some simple logic games such as Nim.

Although promotional materials described it as an "actual working digital computer," the device is more accurately described as a finite-state machine, one of the underpinning concepts used to build computers.

== Reproductions ==
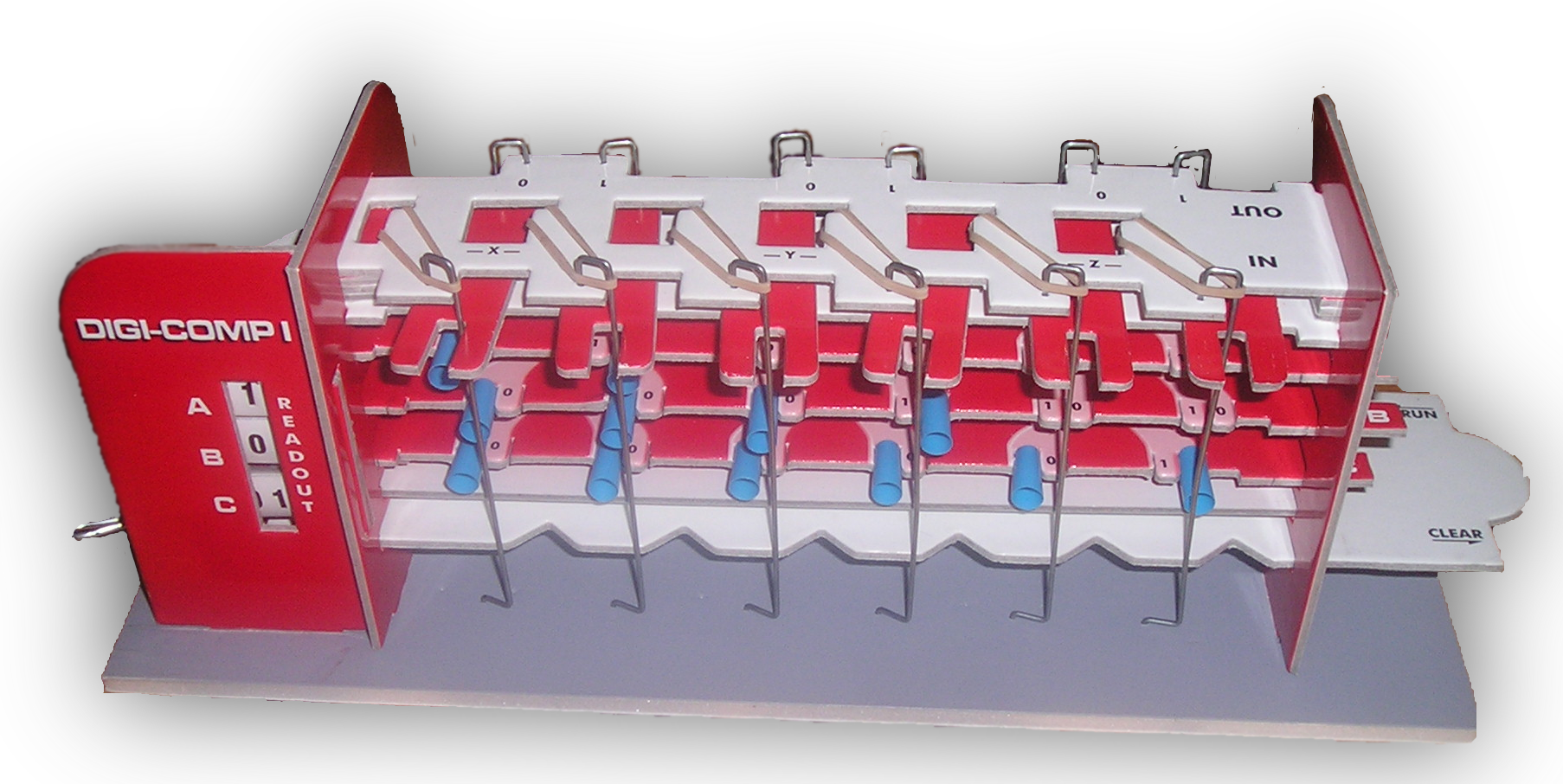
A front view of the Digi-Comp I version 2.0

Starting in 2005, Minds-On Toys has made available the Digi-Comp I version 2.0 as a relatively inexpensive binder's board version of the original Digi-Comp, albeit with a much enhanced instruction manual.

== See also ==
- Dr. Nim - game based on the computer
- Geniac
- WDR paper computer
- CARDboard Illustrative Aid to Computation
- Turing Tumble, a 2019 mechanical computer inspired by it
- Robert C. Martin, who credits playing with this toy at the age of 12 as being what made him decide to become a programmer for the rest of his life.
- Little man computer
