= Simon (computer) =

1950 electromechanical computer

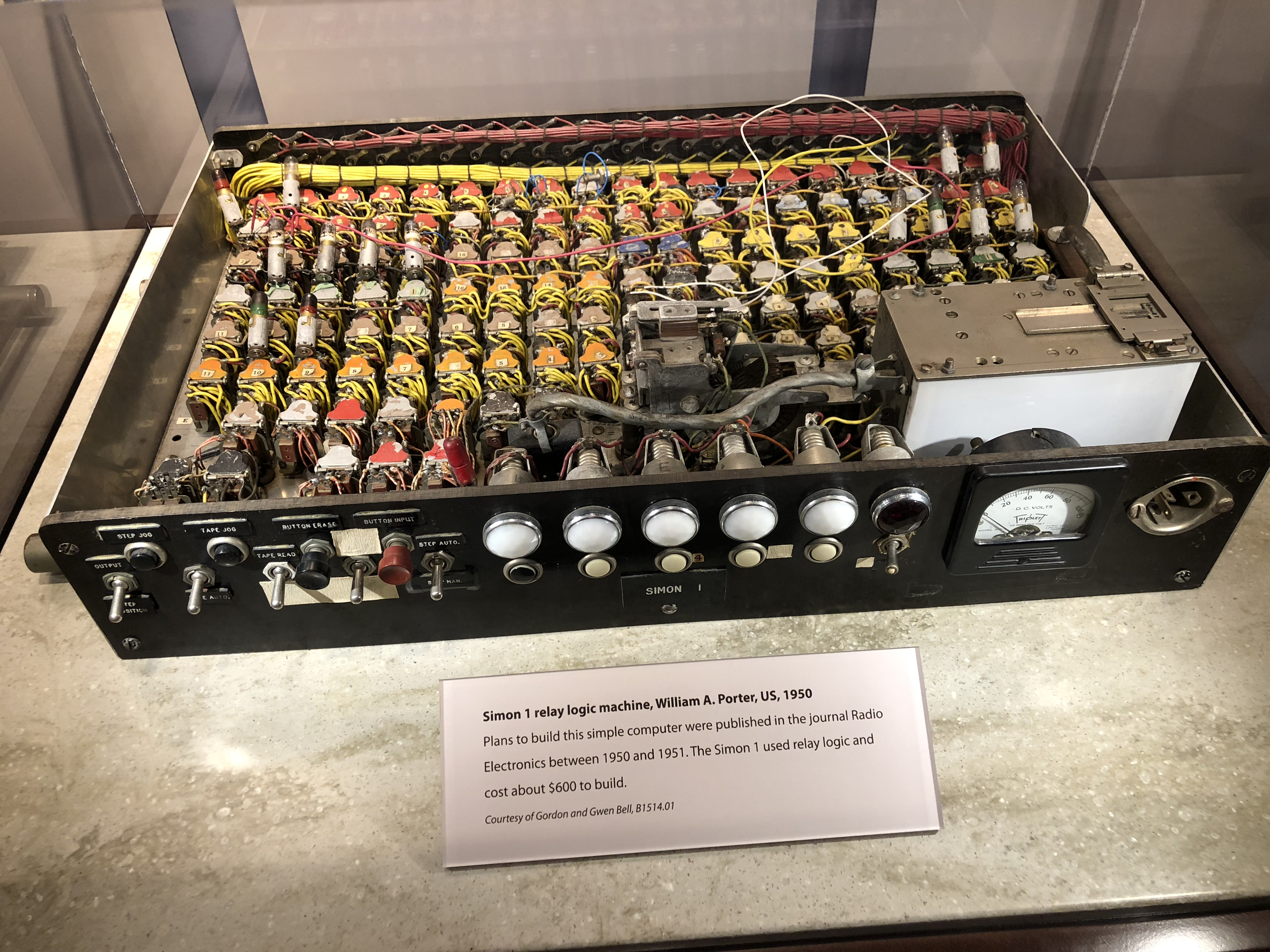
- Released: 1950; 76 years ago

Simon was a relay-based electromechanical computer, described by Edmund Berkeley in a series of thirteen construction articles in Radio-Electronics magazine, from October 1950. Intended for the educational purpose of demonstrating the concept of a digital computer, it could not be used for any significant practical computation since it handled only two-bit numbers (values 0 through 3) and had only 32 bits (16 two-bit registers) of memory. A working model was first built by two graduate students at Columbia University for less than US$300 ($3,650 in 2022 dollars) in parts. Some have described it as the "first personal computer", although its extremely limited capacity and its unsuitability for use for any purpose other than as an educational demonstration make that classification questionable.

== History ==
The "Simon project" arose as a result of the Berkeley's book Giant Brains, or Machines That Think, published in November 1949. There, the author said:

We shall now consider how we can design a very simple machine that will think.. Let us call it Simon, because of its predecessor, Simple Simon... Simon is so simple and so small in fact that it could be built to fill up less space than a grocery-store box; about four cubic feet....It may seem that a simple model of a mechanical brain like Simon is of no great practical use. On the contrary, Simon has the same use in instruction as a set of simple chemical experiments has: to stimulate thinking and understanding, and to produce training and skill. A training course on mechanical brains could very well include the construction of a simple model mechanical brain, as an exercise.

In November 1950, Berkeley wrote an article titled "Simple Simon" for Scientific American magazine, that described digital computing principles to the general public. Despite Simon's extreme lack of resources (it could only represent the numbers 0, 1, 2 and 3), Berkeley stated on page 40 that the machine "possessed the two unique properties that define any true mechanical brain: it can transfer information automatically from any one of its "registers" to any other, and it can perform reasoning operations of indefinite length." Berkeley concluded his article anticipating the future:

Some day we may even have small computers in our homes, drawing their energy from electric-power lines like refrigerators or radios ... They may recall facts for us that we would have trouble remembering. They may calculate accounts and income taxes. Schoolboys with homework may seek their help. They may even run through and list combinations of possibilities that we need to consider in making important decisions. We may find the future full of mechanical brains working about us.

== Technical specifications ==
The Simon's architecture was based on relays. The programs ran from a standard paper tape, with five rows of holes for data. The registers and ALU stored only two bits. The user entered data via punched paper, or by five keys on the front panel. The machine output data through five lamps.

The punched tape served not only for data entry, but also as memory storage. The machine executed instructions in sequence, as it read them from the tape. It could perform four operations: addition, negation, greater than, and selection.
