= E.S.R., Inc. =

Educational toy manufacturer based in U.S.

E.S.R., Inc. was an American manufacturer of educational toys during the 1960s. The company’s founders included William H. Duerig and Irving J. Lieberman, both involved in missile research at Kearfott Guidance in New Jersey, and C. David Hogan, an engineering student at Stevens Institute of Technology (who happened to be renting a room from Duerig and his wife). Together the three brainstormed Lieberman’s concept for a simple mechanical computer, and showed a prototype at the annual Toy Fair in New York City.

With encouragement from toy buyers, the three engineers established E.S.R., Inc. in 1963 to produce and market their new toy, dubbed the Digi-Comp I, which has been referred to as the first home computer. According to Duerig, the initials "E.S.R." didn’t actually stand for anything. Originally the group had wanted to name their company Electronic Systems Research, but that name was already taken; an attorney suggested using just the initials. (Later product packaging fleshed out the name as “Education Science Research,” but officially the company remained E.S.R., doing business at 34 Label Street in Montclair, New Jersey.)

Digi-Comp I became a best-selling toy, its sales passing 100,000 units within several years. Several other products followed, all supplied by outside inventors to be manufactured and marketed by E.S.R. John Godfrey, an engineer at General Electric in Schenectady, NY, brought his concepts for both Dr. Nim and Digi-Comp II to E.S.R.’s attention. Joseph Weisbecker, from RCA in Princeton, NJ, who designed games on the side, came up with the idea for Think-a-Dot. Both Lieberman and Duerig continued their careers at Kearfott through E.S.R.'s heyday. Dave Hogan, with expertise in plastic injection molding, played a pivotal role on the manufacturing side as the company's general manager.

By the early 1970s, with the advent of electronic toys and calculators, E.S.R.'s sales were in steep decline. The company purchased the Long Island-based educational game publisher EduCards, and for several years continued operation under that name, until being bought out in turn in the mid-1970s.
