= Geniac =

Educational toy

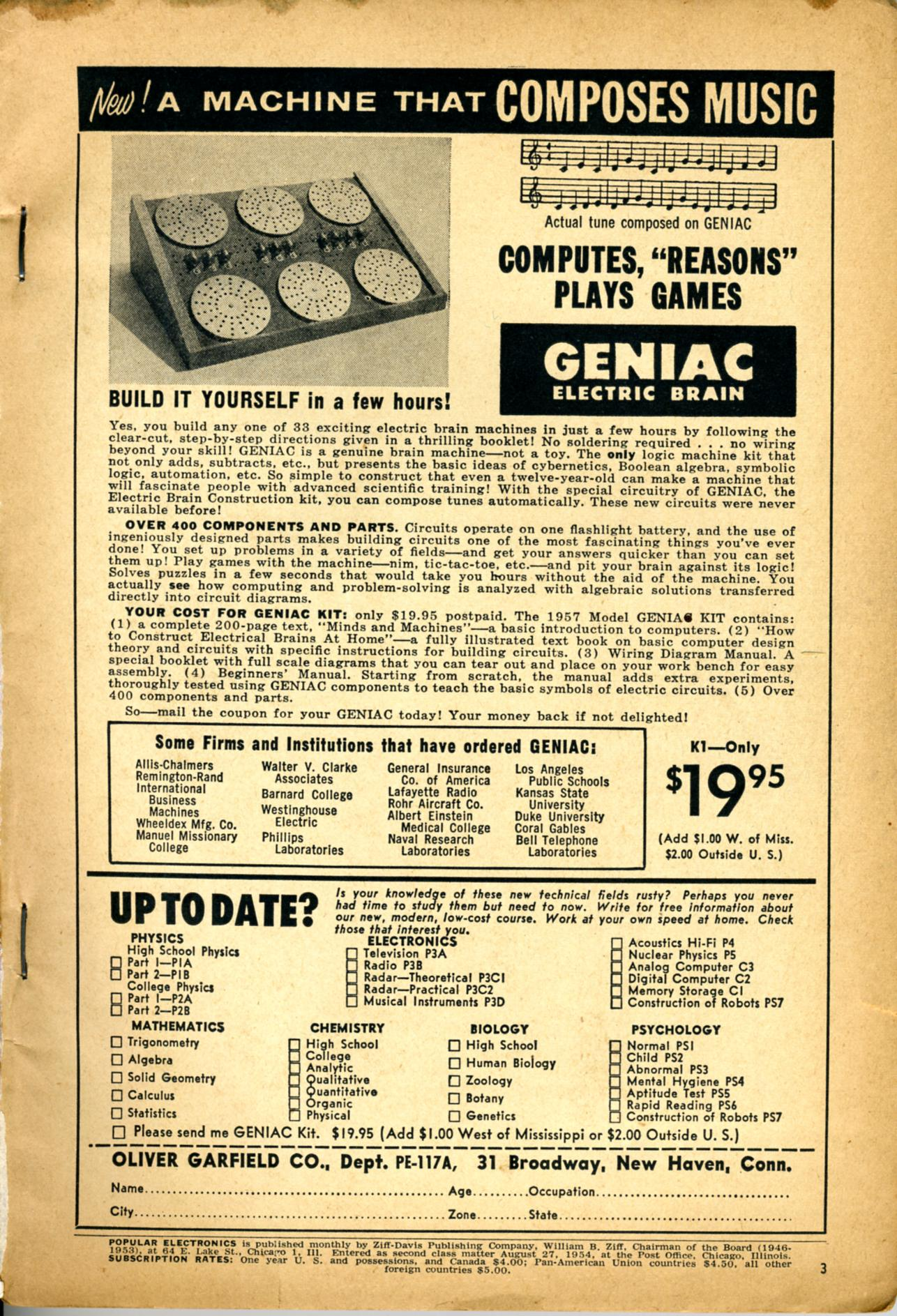
- A 1957 magazine advert for Geniac
- Type: Educational toy
- Invented by: Edmund Berkeley; Oliver Garfield
- Availability: 1955–1958

Geniac was a mechanical computer sold as an educational toy designed and marketed by Edmund Berkeley, with Oliver Garfield from 1955 to 1958, but with Garfield continuing without Berkeley through the 1960s. The name stood for "Genius Almost-automatic Computer" but suggests a portmanteau of genius and ENIAC (the first fully electronic general-purpose computer).

== Construction ==
The Geniac kit consisted of a wedge-shaped case, a console panel, and nearly 400 other parts available for assembly. It was powered by a flashlight battery.

Basically a rotary switch construction set, the Geniac contained six perforated masonite disks, into the back of which brass jumpers could be inserted. The jumpers made electrical connections between slotted brass bolt heads sitting out from the similarly perforated masonite back panel. To the bolts were attached wires behind the panel. The circuit comprised a battery, such wires from it to, and between, switch positions, wires from the switches to indicator flashlight bulbs set along the panel's middle, and return wires to the battery to complete the circuit.

Setting up Geniac to solve a new problem or perform a new operation involved rewiring the jumpers on the back panel, a task advertised as taking only a few minutes.

== Operation ==
With this basic setup Geniac could use combinational logic only, its outputs depending entirely on inputs manually set. It had no active elements at all – no relays, tubes, or transistors – to allow a machine state to automatically influence subsequent states. Thus, Geniac didn't have memory and couldn't solve problems using sequential logic. All sequencing was performed manually by the operator, sometimes following fairly complicated printed directions (turn this wheel in this direction if this light lights, etc.)

The main instruction book, as well as a supplementary book of wiring diagrams, gave jumper positions and wiring diagrams for building a number of "machines," which could realize fairly complicated Boolean equations. A copy of Claude Shannon's groundbreaking thesis in the subject, A Symbolic Analysis of Relay and Switching Circuits, was also included.

== A typical project ==
A typical project was a primitive "Masculine–Feminine Testing Machine". The user was instructed to answer five questions related to gender, such as "Which makes a better toy for a child: (a) electric train? (b) a doll with a complete wardrobe?" Having wired five of the six rotary switches and set them to "off" positions, questions could be asked. For each "a" answer, a switch was turned to one of two "on" positions, setting a circuit segment; for each "b" answer, the other "on" position. The circuitry sensed the cumulative effect of the switch positions, the circuit being completed, and a "more masculine" or "more feminine" bulb lit, once three masculine or three feminine answers were recorded.

== Popularity ==
Widely advertised in magazines such as Galaxy Science Fiction, the Geniac provided many youths with their first hands-on introduction to computer concepts and Boolean logic.

== Brainiac ==
A nearly identical product, called Brainiac, was introduced in 1958 by Edmund Berkeley, after he had a falling out with Oliver Garfield. The device would influence the portrayal of the Superman villain Brainiac introduced the same year, whose creation was attributed by the editor to a "remarkable coincidence."

== Helical slide rule ==
Oliver Garfield also sold the Otis King's Patent Calculator, a helical slide rule, under the Geniac brand. Initially he resold the ones manufactured by Carbic, Ltd., but his later products had no serial numbers so were probably his own version.

== See also ==
- Digi-Comp I
- Digi-Comp II
- WDR paper computer
