= Digi-Comp II =

Marble-based mechanical toy computer

- Logo, extracted from the image of the computer below.

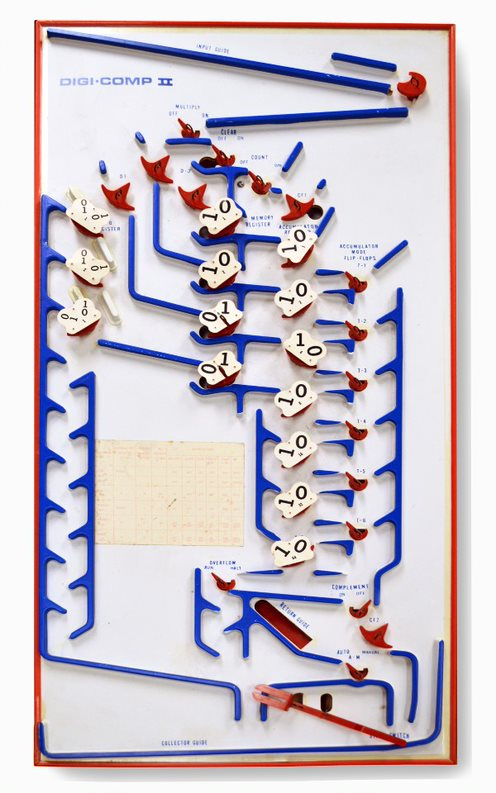
- A Digi-Comp II
- Developer: John Thomas Godfrey
- Released: Late 1960s
- Predecessor: Digi-Comp I

The Digi-Comp II was a toy computer invented by John "Jack" Thomas Godfrey (1924–2009) in 1965 and manufactured by E.S.R., Inc. in the late 1960s, that used 1/2 inch (12.5 mm) marbles rolling down a ramp to perform basic calculations.

== Description ==
A two-level masonite platform with blue plastic guides served as the medium for a supply of marbles that rolled down an inclined plane, moving plastic cams as they went. The red plastic cams played the part of flip-flops in an electronic computer - as a marble passed one of the cams, it would flip the cam around - in one position, the cam would allow the marble to pass in one direction, in the other position, it would cause the marble to drop through a hole and roll to the collection of marbles at the bottom of the machine. The original Digi-Comp II platform measured 14 by 28.5 inches (36 cm × 72 cm).

The Digi-Comp II was not programmable, unlike the Digi-Comp I, an earlier offering in the E.S.R. product line that used an assortment of plastic slides, tubes, and bent metal wires to solve simple logic problems. However, the Digi-Comp II is more suitable for public display, since the only removable elements are the moving balls.

== Computational power ==
Computer scientist Scott Aaronson analyzed the computational power of the Digi-Comp II. There are several ways to mathematically model the device's computational capabilities. A natural abstraction is a directed acyclic graph (DAG) in which each internal vertex has an out-degree of 2, representing a toggle cam that routes balls to one of two other vertices. A fixed number of balls are placed at a designated source vertex, and the decision problem is to determine whether any balls ever reach a designated sink vertex.

Aaronson showed that this decision problem, given as inputs a description of the DAG and the number of balls to run (encoded in unary), is complete under log-space reduction for CC, the class of problems log-space reducible to the stable marriage problem. He also showed that the variant of the problem in which the number of balls is encoded in binary, allowing the machine to run for an exponentially longer time, is still in the P class of complexity.

== Reproductions ==
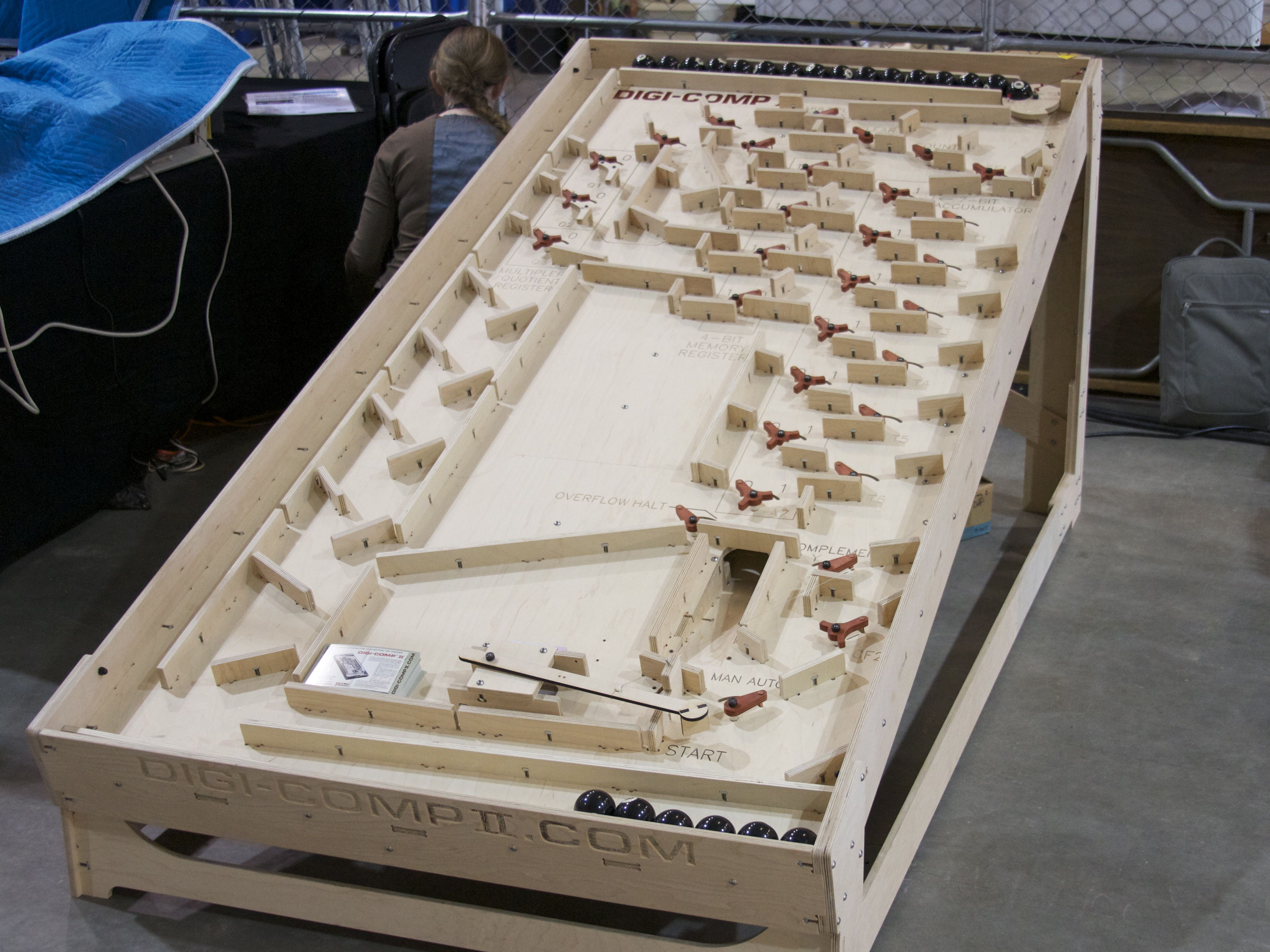
Huge wooden replica of Digi-Comp II by Evil Mad Scientist. The original is a much smaller toy made of wood and plastic.

A slightly downscaled reproduction of the Digi-Comp II, made from plywood, is available from Evil Mad Scientist since 2011. This reproduction uses 11 mm (7/16 in) steel pachinko balls, and measures 10 by 24 inches (25 cm × 61 cm).

In 2011, Evil Mad Scientist also created a giant variant measuring around 4 by 8 feet (1.2 m × 2.4 m) in size that uses billiard balls. The Stata Center at the Massachusetts Institute of Technology displays one copy of the giant version for hands-on operation by visitors.

== See also ==
- Geniac
- Dr. Nim - a Nim-playing game, based on the Digi-Comp II mechanism
- Turing Tumble
- WDR paper computer
- CARDboard Illustrative Aid to Computation
