= Edmund Berkeley =

American computer scientist

Edmund Callis Berkeley (March 21, 1909 – March 7, 1988) was an American computer scientist and actuary who co-founded the Association for Computing Machinery (ACM) in 1947. His 1949 book Giant Brains, or Machines That Think popularized cognitive images of early computers. He was also a social activist who worked to achieve conditions that might minimize the threat of nuclear war.

== Biography ==
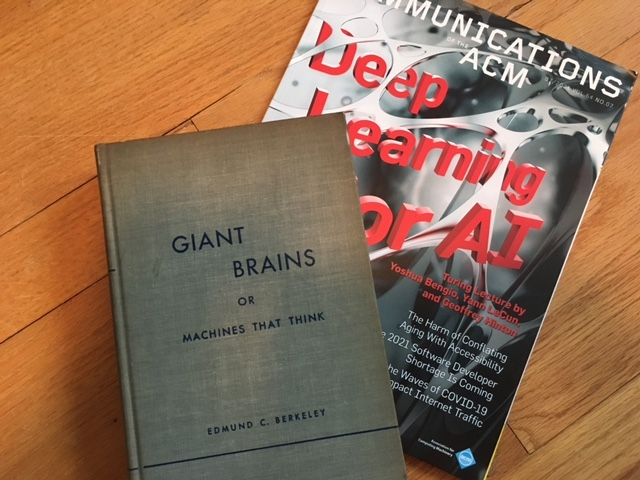
Two legacies of Edmund C. Berkeley: his 1949 book Giant Brains, or Machines That Think, and a 2021 issue of Communications of the ACM, the flagship publication of the computing society he co-founded in 1947

Berkeley attended St. Bernard's School and Phillips Exeter Academy. He received a BA in Mathematics and Logic from Harvard in 1930. He pursued a career as an insurance actuary at Prudential Insurance from 1934–1948, except for service in the United States Navy during World War II.

Berkeley saw George Stibitz's calculator at Bell Laboratories in 1939, and the Harvard Mark I in 1942. In November 1946 he drafted a specification for "Sequence Controlled Calculators for the Prudential", which led to signing a contract with the Eckert-Mauchly Computer Corporation in 1947 for one of the first UNIVAC computers.

He became famous in 1949 with the publication of his book Giant Brains, or Machines That Think in which he described the principles behind computing machines (called then "mechanical brains", "sequence-controlled calculators", or various other terms), and then gave a technical but accessible survey of the most prominent examples of the time, including machines from MIT, Harvard, the Moore School, Bell Laboratories, and elsewhere.

In Giant Brains, Berkeley also outlined a device which some have described as the first "personal computer", Simon. Plans on how to build this computer were published in the journal Radio Electronics in 1950 and 1951. Simon used relay logic and cost about $600 to construct. The first working model was built at Columbia University with the help of two graduate students. He also created the Geniac and Brainiac toy computers.

Berkeley founded, published and edited Computers and Automation, the first computer magazine. He sometimes wrote for the magazine under the pseudonym "Neil D. MacDonald".

He was involved in a "hazards research" at Prudential Insurance, with the goal of determining the greatest hazards facing the modern world. Berkeley came to the conclusion that nuclear war was the biggest existential threat to humanity. After the company dropped the project, Berkeley was forbidden to work on anti-nuclear efforts, even on his own time, prompting him to quit Prudential in 1948 and found his own actuary and computing consultancy.

After World War II, Berkeley became a lifelong peace activist and campaigned against nuclear proliferation. In 1958 Berkeley joined the Committee for a SANE Nuclear Policy (SANE), and was active in the organization's Boston chapter.

== Computer art ==
On the title page of the magazine "Computers and Automation", January 1963, Edmund Berkeley published a picture by Efraim Arazi from 1962 as computer art. This picture inspired him to initiate the first computer art contest in 1963. Berkeley had coined the term "computer art". The annual contest was a key point in the development of computer art up to the year 1973. This way Edmund Berkeley became a pioneer in the field of computer art.

== Books ==
- Giant Brains, or Machines That Think (1949), Wiley & Sons
- Computers: Their Operation and Applications (1956), New York: Reinhold Publishing
- Symbolic Logic and Intelligent Machines (1959), New York: Reinhold Publishing
- Probability and Statistics: An Introduction through Experiments (1961), Science Materials Center
- The Computer Revolution (1962), Doubleday
- The Programming Language LISP: Its Operation and Applications (1964)
- A Guide to Mathematics for the Intelligent Nonmathematician (1966), Simon and Schuster
- Computer-assisted Explanation: A Guide to Explaining: and some ways of using a computer to assist in clear explanation (1967), Information International
- Ride the East Wind; Parables of Yesterday and Today (1973), Quadrangle, ISBN 0-8129-0375-7
- The Computer Book of Lists and First Computer Almanack (1984), Reston Publishing, ISBN 0-8359-0864-X
