= CARDboard Illustrative Aid to Computation =

Learning aid

A power of two program running in a CARDIAC emulator. The program outputs 1, 2, 4, 8, ..., 512 and halts after 277 steps.

CARDIAC (CARDboard Illustrative Aid to Computation) is a learning aid developed by David Hagelbarger and Saul Fingerman for Bell Telephone Laboratories in 1968 to teach high school students how computers work. The kit consists of an instruction manual and a die-cut cardboard "computer".

The computer "operates" by means of pencil and sliding cards. Any arithmetic is done in the head of the person operating the computer. The computer operates in base 10 and has 100 memory cells which can hold signed numbers from 0 to ±999. It has an instruction set of 10 instructions which allows CARDIAC to add, subtract, test, shift, input, output, and jump.

The CARDIAC was also published in France as the Ordinapoche ("pocket computer", from ordinateur and poche) by Science & Vie in 1981.

== Hardware ==
Front of CARDIAC device

The “CPU” of the computer consists of 4 slides that move various numbers and arrows to have the flow of the real CPU (the user's brain) move the right way. They have one flag (+/-), affected by the result in the accumulator.

Memory consists of the other half of the cardboard cutout. There are 100 cells. Cell 0 is “ROM”, always containing a numeric "1"; cells 1 to 98 are “RAM”; available for instructions and data; and cell 99 can best be described as “EEPROM”.

Memory cells hold signed decimal numbers from 0 to ±999 and are written with a pencil. Cells are erased with an eraser. A “bug” is provided to act as a program counter, and is placed in a hole beside the current memory cell.

== Programming ==
CARDIAC has a 10 instruction machine language. An instruction is three decimal digits (the sign is ignored) in the form OAA. The first digit is the op code (O); the second and third digits are an address (AA). Addressing is one of accumulator to memory absolute, absolute memory to accumulator, input to absolute memory and absolute memory to output.

Input and output are done via virtual punch cards and this is also how programs are loaded into the computer: Programs are hand assembled to create an input stack of cards. The first instruction the CARDIAC executes is always 001 (in location 0) which will load the first card into location 1. Subsequent cards then establish a loop which will load all remaining program cards into memory and start execution of the program. This program loading behavior is similar to real card-based computers of the era (e.g. IBM 1401 or IBM 1620) and different from the Little Man Computer (LMC) where the program is simply penciled into the appropriate memory cells directly without a loading step.

The CARDIAC instruction set is very similar to the LMC, except that the LMC has two conditional jump instructions, where CARDIAC only has one but adds an accumulator shift instruction instead. Also, the CARDIAC input/output instructions work directly from memory cells, while the LMC uses the accumulator for input/output.

High-level languages have never been developed for CARDIAC as they would defeat one of the purposes of the device: to introduce concepts of assembly language programming.

== Instruction Set ==
CARDIAC Instruction Set
Opcode	Mnemonic	Instruction	Description
0	INP	Input	take a number from the input card and put it in a specified memory cell.
1	CLA	Clear and add	clear the accumulator and add the contents of a memory cell to the accumulator.
2	ADD	Add	add the contents of a memory cell to the accumulator.
3	TAC	Test accumulator contents	performs a sign test on the contents of the accumulator; if minus, jump to a specified memory cell.
4	SFT	Shift	shifts the accumulator x places left, then y places right, where x is the upper address digit and y is the lower.
5	OUT	Output	take a number from the specified memory cell and write it on the output card.
6	STO	Store	copy the contents of the accumulator into a specified memory cell.
7	SUB	Subtract	subtract the contents of a specified memory cell from the accumulator.
8	JMP	Jump	jump to a specified memory cell. The current cell number is written in cell 99. This allows for one level of subroutines by having the return be the instruction at cell 99 (which had '8' hardcoded as the first digit.
9	HRS	Halt and reset	move bug to the specified cell, then stop program execution.

== Operation ==
Programs are run by first sliding three slides so that the number in the instruction register equals the number in the memory cell the bug is sitting in. Once that is done the bug is moved to the next memory cell. The user then follows an arrow which will then tell them what to do next. This continues for all of program execution.

== See also ==
- Little man computer (another instructional model)
- WDR paper computer
