= Turing Tumble =

Game and demonstration of logic gates

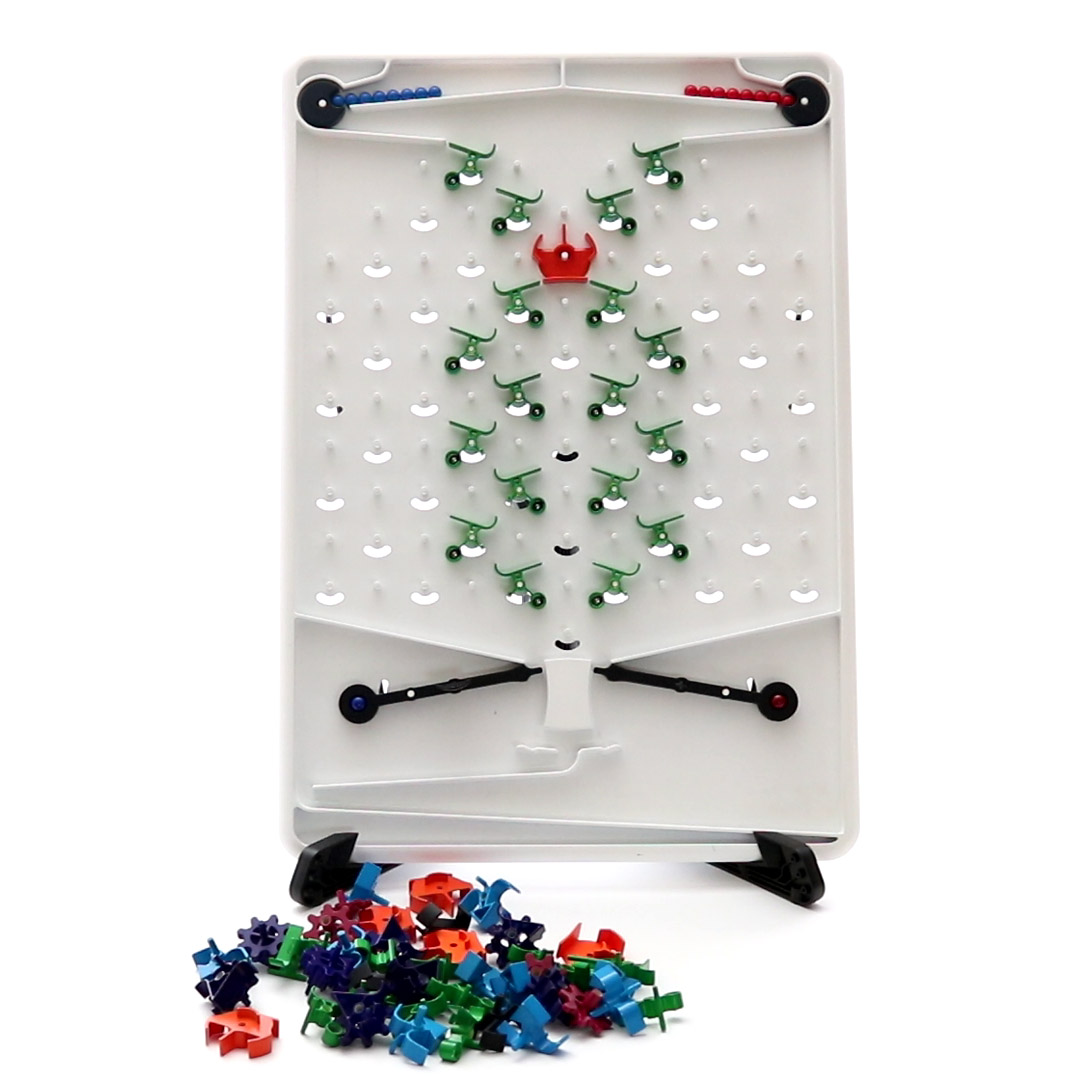
A beginner's Turing Tumble layout

Turing Tumble is a game and demonstration of logic gates via mechanical computing.

== Description ==
Named after Alan Turing, the game could, in the abstract, duplicate the processes of any computer whatsoever if the game field itself were sufficiently large. This follows because the game is P-complete by the circuit value problem and PSPACE-complete if an exponential number of marbles is allowed. The device has implications for nanotechnology.

The game is advertised as Turing complete: an extension of the game that allows an infinitely large board and infinitely many pieces has been shown to be Turing complete via simulations of both Rule 110 for cellular automata, as well as of Turing machines.

Although it resembles a pachinko machine in its aesthetic use of gravity-fed metal balls, it is primarily a teaching device in the fundamentals of logic-computer programming, and as such is an example of gamification. The framing device in the included comic book features an astronaut who must solve 60 increasingly difficult logic problems that illustrate the fundamentals of computer programming.

== History ==
The impetus of the puzzles included with the device was the frustration of the programmer and chemistry professor Paul Boswell (along with his wife, Alyssa Boswell, a DIY maker), then at the University of Minnesota, at the lack of computing prowess of other scientists which was necessary for their own projects. Boswell was already well known for programming complex games for Texas Instruments computers. The inventors were also inspired by the Digi-Comp II, a precursor from the late 1960s.

== Components ==
A Turing Tumble machine has the following parts:

- Ball drops – The standard version uses two ramps that store a given number of balls. A switch at the bottom of the board triggers the release of the initial ball (typically blue), from the top left of the panel. The second ramp, on the right, contains red balls.
- Ramps and crossovers – The green ramp allows the balls to run down it one way and release it in only that direction, whereas the orange crossover lets balls traverse it to either side both ways, i.e. from right to left and vice versa.
- Interceptors – This black piece stops a ball.
- Bits – This is a one-bit storage: it changes direction when a ball rolls through, such that the next ball goes to the other side.
- Gear and gear bits – Gear bits are exactly like regular bits, but they can be connected to gears. The gears allow for linking state changes, thus integrally adding extra (abstract) power.

== Reception ==
Critically, the device has received high praise for its concept and execution, albeit with some caveats (the recommended age being 8+).

The computing game has won the Parents' Choice Gold Award, and won in the category "Best Toys of the Year 2018" under the aegis of the American Specialty Toy Retailing Association.
