= Chemistry set =

Educational toy

External videos
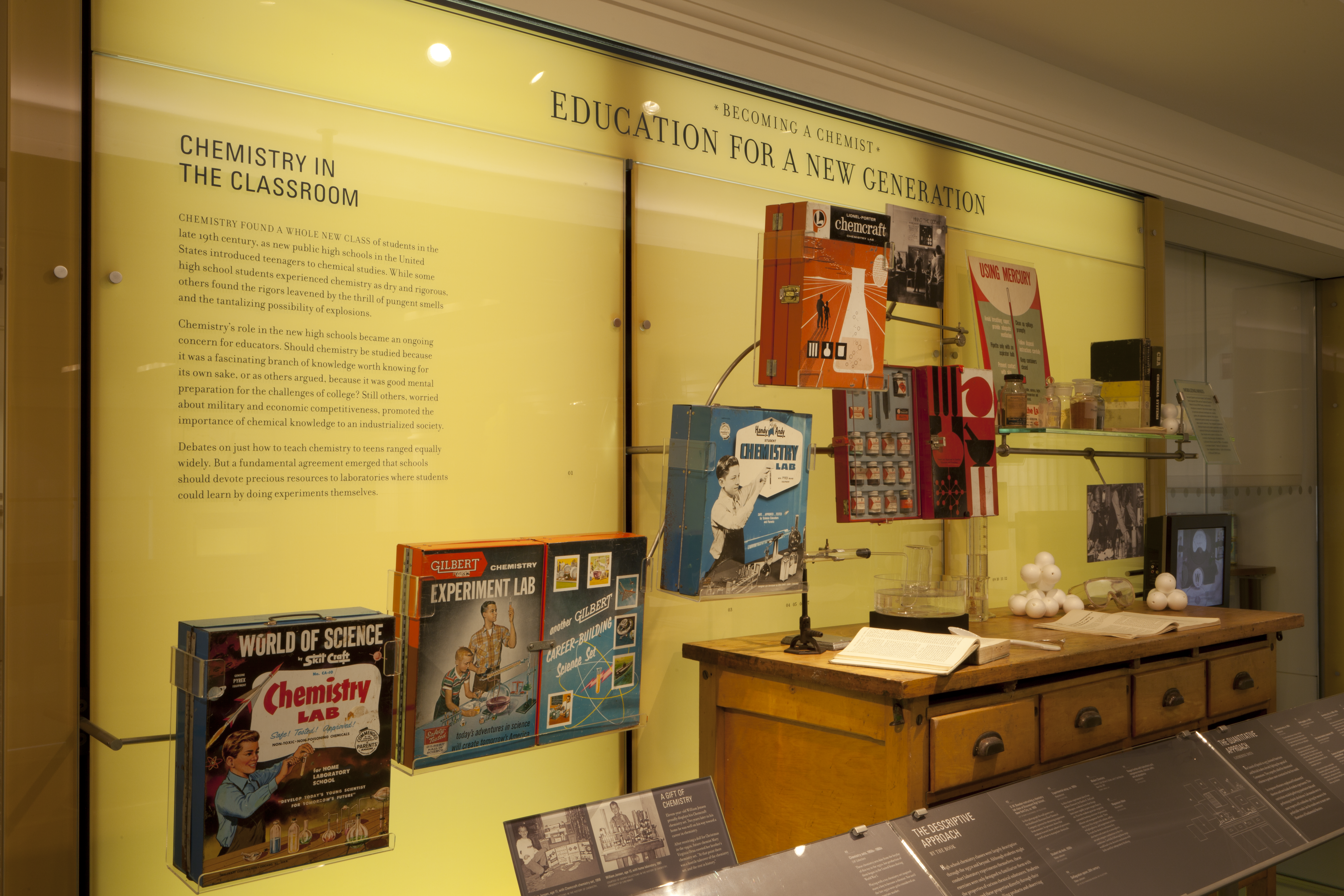
- Education for a New Generation: The Chemistry Set in History, Science History Institute

A chemistry set is an educational toy allowing the user (typically a teenager) to perform simple chemistry experiments.

== History ==
=== Forerunners ===
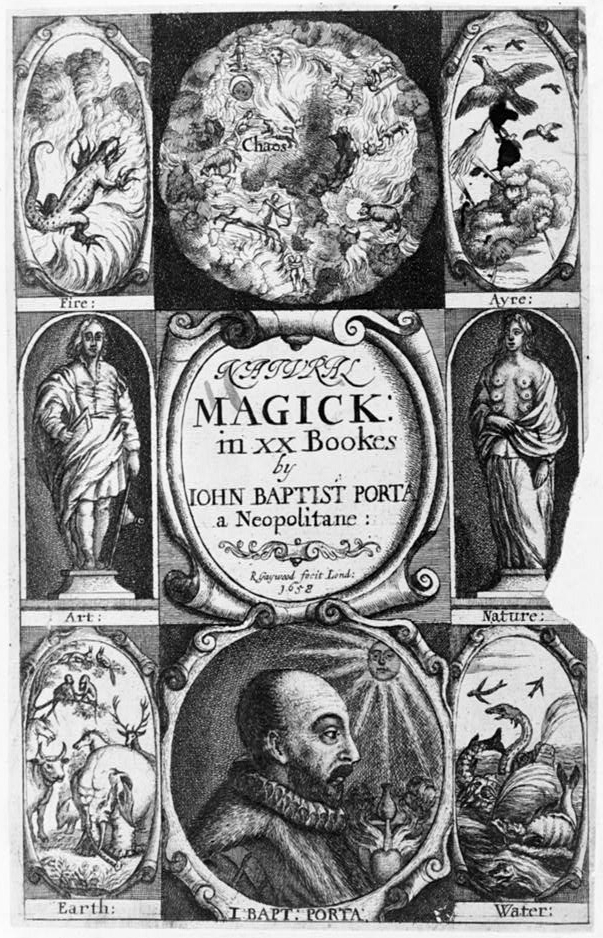
Natural Magick, Giambattista della Porta (1658).

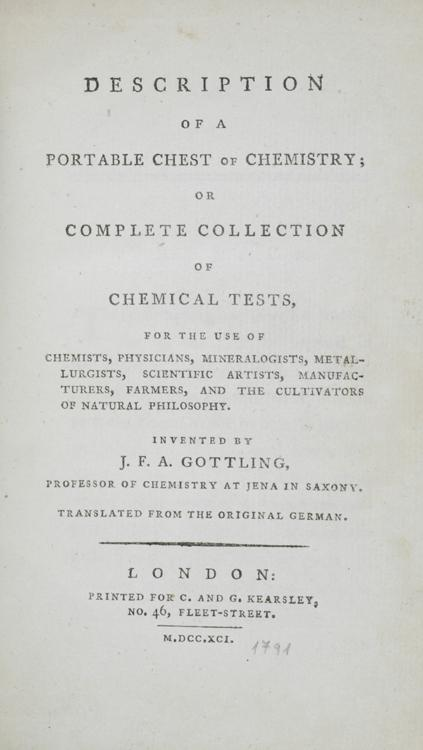
Description of a portable chest of chemistry (1791).

The forerunners of the chemistry set were 17th-century books on "natural magick", "which all excellent wise men do admit and embrace, and worship with great applause; neither is there any thing more highly esteemed, or better thought of, by men of learning." Authors, such as Giambattista della Porta, included chemical magic tricks and scientific puzzles along with more serious topics.

The earliest chemistry sets were developed in the 18th century in England and Germany to teach chemistry to adults. In 1791, Description of a portable chest of chemistry : or, Complete collection of chemical tests for the use of chemists, physicians, mineralogists, metallurgists, scientific artists, manufacturers, farmers, and the cultivators of natural philosophy by Johann Friedrich August Göttling, translated from German, was published in English. Friedrich Accum of London, England, also sold portable chemistry sets and materials to refill them. Primarily used for training druggists and medical students, they could also be carried and used in the field.

Scientific kits also attracted well-educated members of the upper class who enjoyed experimenting and demonstrating their results. James Woodhouse of Philadelphia presented a Young Chemist's Pocket Companion (1797) with an accompanying portable laboratory that specifically targeted ladies and gentlemen. Jane Marcet's books on chemistry helped to popularize chemistry as a well-to-do pastime for both men and women.

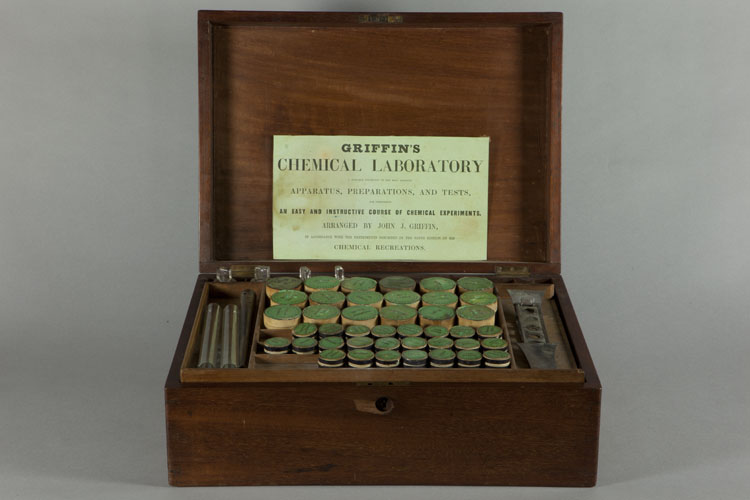
Griffin's Chemical Laboratory, Glasgow (ca.1850).

Beginning in the late 1850s, John J. Griffin & Sons sold a line of "chemical cabinets", eventually offering 11 categories. These were marketed primarily to adults, including elementary school teachers as well as students at the Royal Naval College, the Royal Agricultural Society, and the universities of Oxford and Cambridge.

From the mid- to the late 1800s, in England, magic and illusion toys enabled children to make their own fireworks, create disappearing inks, and cause changes in color, tricks that were mostly chemically based. The Columbian Cyclopedia of 1897 defines "CHEMISTRY TOYS" as "mostly pyrotechnic; recommended as illustrating to the young the rudiments of chemistry, but probably more dangerous than efficient for such use", listing a variety of hazardous examples.

=== Chemistry sets as toys ===
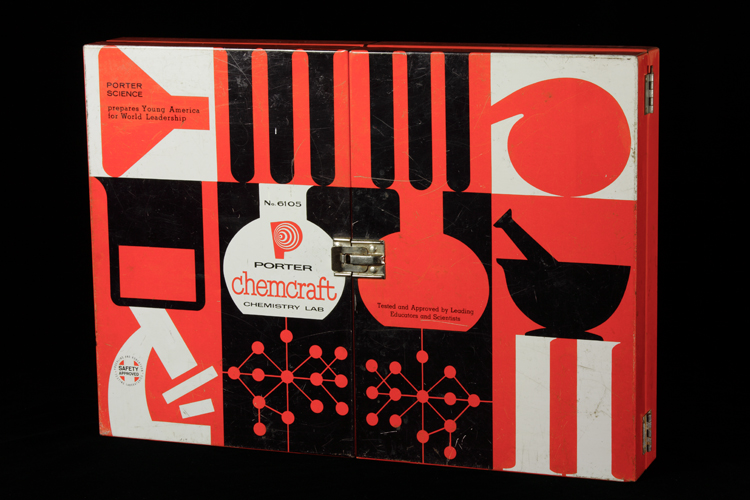
Porter Chemcraft Senior Set, 1957, at the Science History Institute

Beginning in the early 1900s, modern chemistry sets targeted younger people with the intention to popularize chemistry. In the United States, Porter Chemical Company and the A. C. Gilbert Company produced the best known sets. Although Porter and Gilbert were the largest American producers of chemistry sets, other manufacturers, such as the Skilcraft corporation, were also active.

John J. Porter and his brother Harold Mitchell Porter began The Porter Chemical Company in 1914. Their initial purpose was to sell packaged chemicals, but they soon introduced kits. John researched the experiments, while Harold wrote the instruction manuals. Their earliest toys, under the "Chemcraft" trademark, were "chemical magic" sets, selling for less than one dollar (or about $25 in 2017). By the 1920s, they sold six different sets, the largest of which sold for $25 (or about $320 in 2017). Their range of toys broadened throughout the 1930s. In the 1950s it was possible to buy toys featuring radioactive ores, such as the "Gilbert U-238 Atomic Energy Laboratory," which included a Geiger counter and cloud chamber.

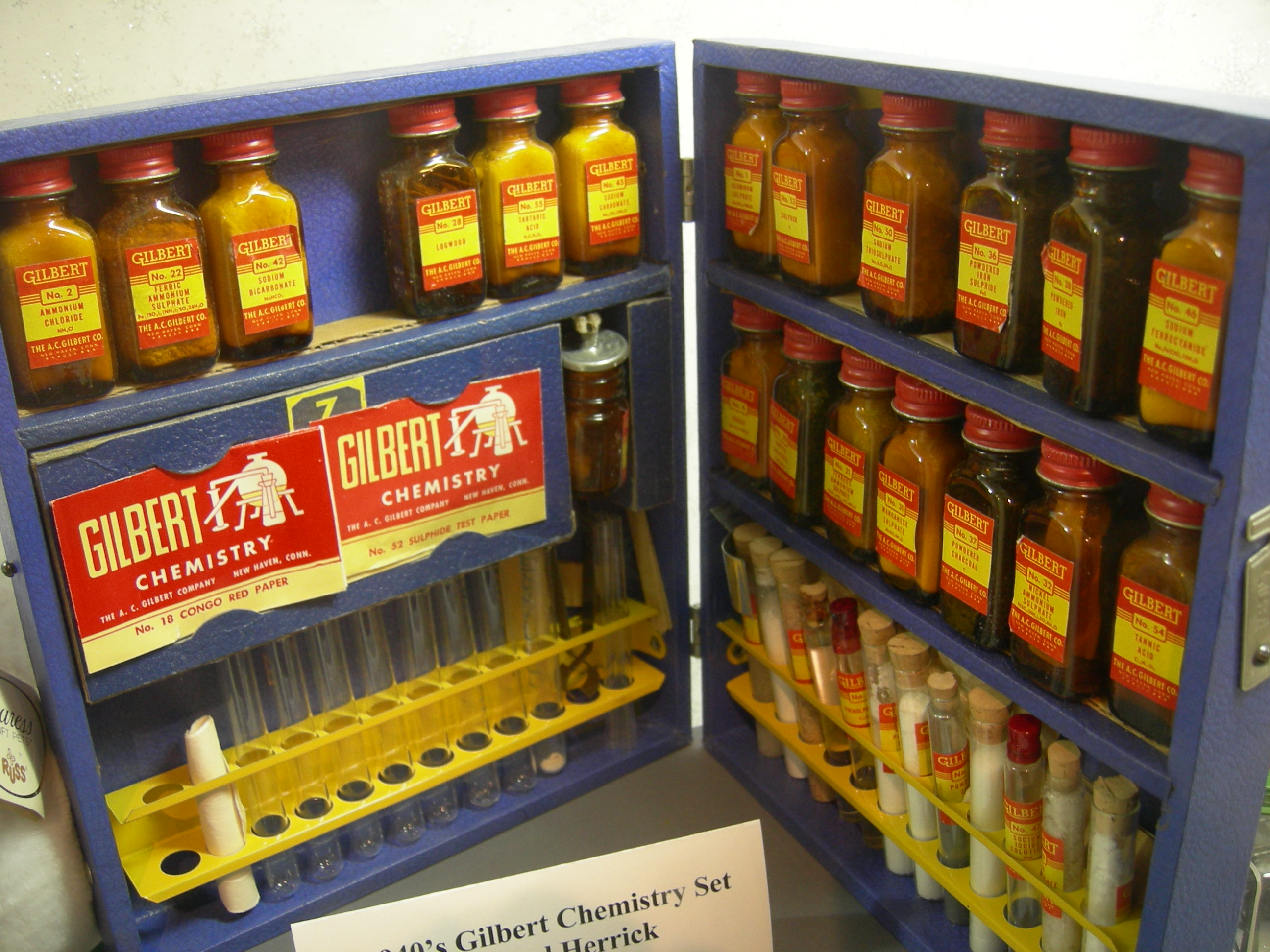
A 1940s Gilbert chemistry set

Alfred Carlton Gilbert earned money by performing magic tricks while a medical student at Yale. He and John Petrie formed the Mysto Manufacturing Company (later the A. C. Gilbert Company) in 1909, and began selling boxed magic sets. By 1917, they sold chemistry sets, which they produced through World War II, in spite of restrictions on materials. Robert Treat Johnson, noting the number of chemistry students at Yale whose interest in the science began with a chemistry set, argued the production of chemistry sets was a "patriotic duty."

Toy companies promoted chemistry sets through advertising campaigns, the "Chemcraft Chemist Club" and its accompanying "Chemcraft Science Magazine", comic books, and essay contests such as Porter's "Why I want to be a scientist". The goal of attracting students to a potential career in chemistry was often explicit in the sets' naming and promotion. Chemistry sets may have been the first American toys marketed toward parents with the goal of "improving" children for success in later life.

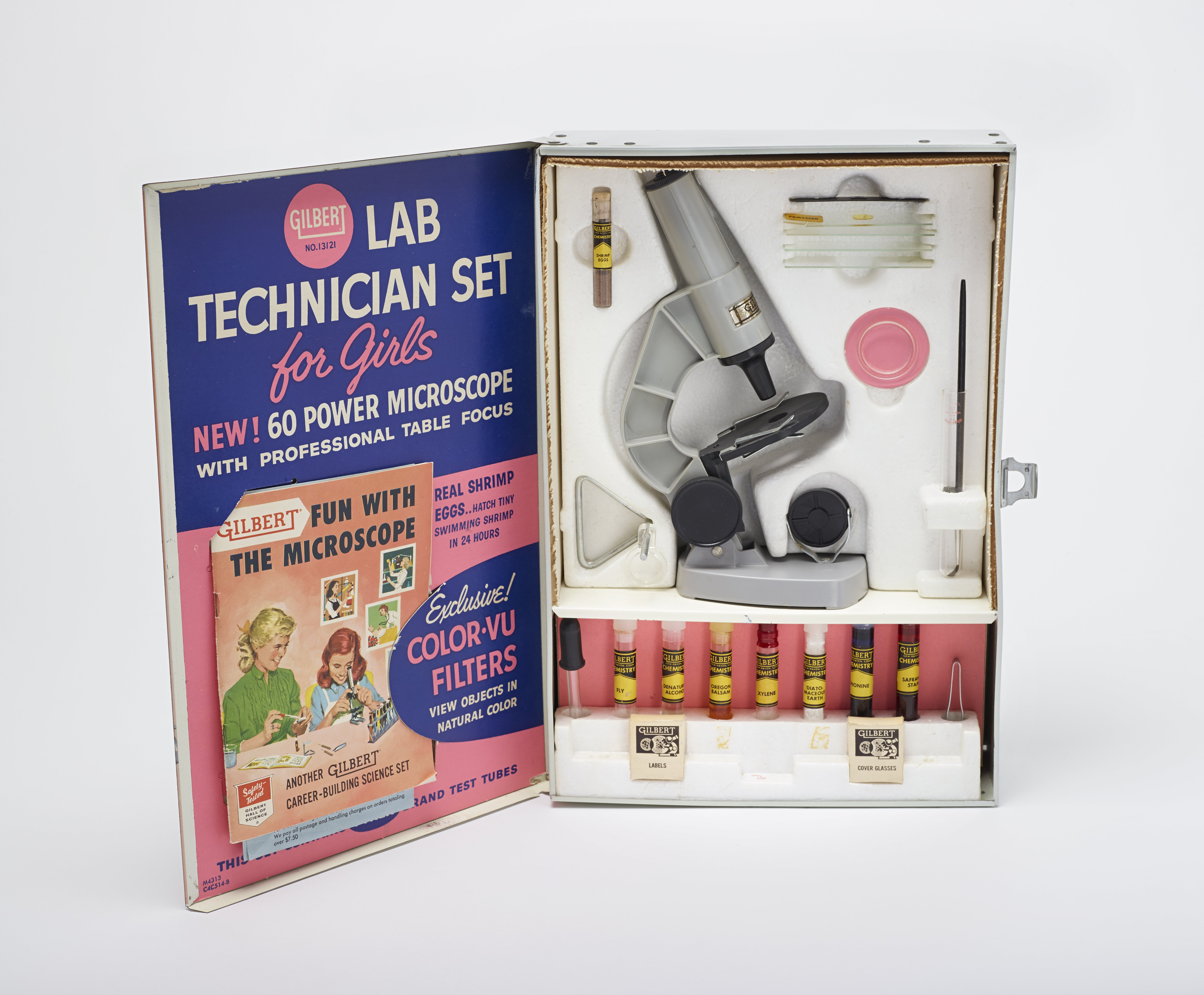
Gilbert Lab Technician Set for Girls, 1958, at the Science History Institute

Johnny Horizon Environmental Test Kit, 1971, at the Science History Institute

The target market for chemistry sets was almost exclusively boys, deemed "young men of science." However, during the 1950s, Gilbert introduced a set targeting girls. They sold the set in an attractive pink box, but the set identified girls as "laboratory assistants" or "lab technicians," not scientists.

In 1971, a Johnny Horizon Environmental Test Kit was licensed by the U. S. Department of the Interior and produced by Parker Brothers. It included four air pollution tests and six water pollution tests for young environmental scientists. The Johnny Horizon Environmental Test Kit was marketed to both boys and girls.

Well-known chemistry sets from the United Kingdom include the 1960s and 1970s sets by Thomas Salter Science (produced in Scotland) and later Salter Science, then the "MERIT" sets through the 1970s and 1980s. Dekkertoys created a range of sets which were similar, complete with glass test tubes of dry chemicals.

== Decline ==
Around the 1960s, safety concerns began to limit the range of materials and experiments available in chemistry sets. In the United States, the Federal Hazardous Substances Labeling Act of 1960, the Toy Safety Act of 1969, the Consumer Product Safety Commission, established in 1972, and the Toxic Substances Control Act of 1976 all introduced new levels of regulation, which led to the decline of chemistry sets' popularity during the 1970s and 1980s. The A. C. Gilbert Company went out of business in 1967, and the Porter Chemical Company went out of business in 1984.

Modern chemistry sets, with a few exceptions, tend to include a more restricted range of chemicals and simplified instructions. Many chemistry kits are single use, containing only the types and amounts of chemicals for a specific application. Several authors note from the 1980s on, concerns about illegal drug production, terrorism, and legal liability have led to chemistry sets becoming increasingly bland and unexciting.

In recent years, the chemistry set has been re-imagined as a self-study kit, typically offering students better equipment and more explanatory tutorial content. For example, Thames & Kosmos offers a range of CHEM series chemistry sets targeting older children, culminating in the C3000 Kit, which includes a 172-page manual describing 387 experiments, although it does retail for almost US$300.

== Contents ==
Typical contents found in chemistry sets, including equipment and chemicals, might include:

=== Equipment ===
- vials of dry chemicals
- metal wires, such as copper, nickel or zinc
- metal filings, such as iron
- graphite rods
- a balance and weights
- a measuring cylinder
- a thermometer
- a magnifying glass
- pipettes
- beakers, retorts, flasks, test tubes, U-tubes or other reaction vessels
- cork stoppers
- watch glasses
- glass and rubber tubing
- test tube holders, retort stands and clamps
- an alcohol burner or other heat source
- a filter funnel and filter paper
- universal indicator paper or litmus paper
- safety goggles
- an instruction manual

=== Chemicals ===
- Aluminium ammonium sulfate
- Aluminium sulfate
- Ammonium chloride
- Borax
- Calcium chloride
- Calcium sulfate
- Cobalt chloride
- Cupric chloride
- Copper sulfate
- Ferric ammonium sulfate
- Ferrous sulfate
- Gum Arabic
- Magnesium ribbon
- Magnesium chloride
- Magnesium sulfate
- Manganese sulfate
- Phenolphthalein
- Polyvinyl alcohol
- Potassium chloride
- Potassium iodide
- Potassium nitrate
- Potassium permanganate
- Potassium sulfate
- Powdered charcoal
- Powdered iron
- Sodium bisulfate
- Sodium bisulfite
- Sodium carbonate
- Sodium ferrocyanide
- Sodium silicate
- Sodium thiosulfate
- Strontium chloride
- Strontium nitrate
- Sulfur
- Tannic acid
- Tartaric acid
- Zinc sulfate

The experiments described in the instruction manual typically require a number of chemicals not shipped with the chemistry set, because they are common household chemicals:

- Acetic acid (in vinegar)
- Ammonium carbonate ("baker's ammonia" or "salts of hartshorn")
- Citric acid (in lemons)
- Ethanol (in denatured alcohol)
- Sodium bicarbonate (baking soda)
- Sodium chloride ("table salt")

Other chemicals, including strong acids, bases and oxidizers cannot be safely shipped with the set and others having a limited shelf life have to be purchased separately from a drug store:

- Hydrochloric acid
- Hydrogen peroxide
- Silver nitrate
- Sodium hydroxide

== See also ==
- Amateur chemistry
