= Sublimation =

Transition from solid to gas without melting

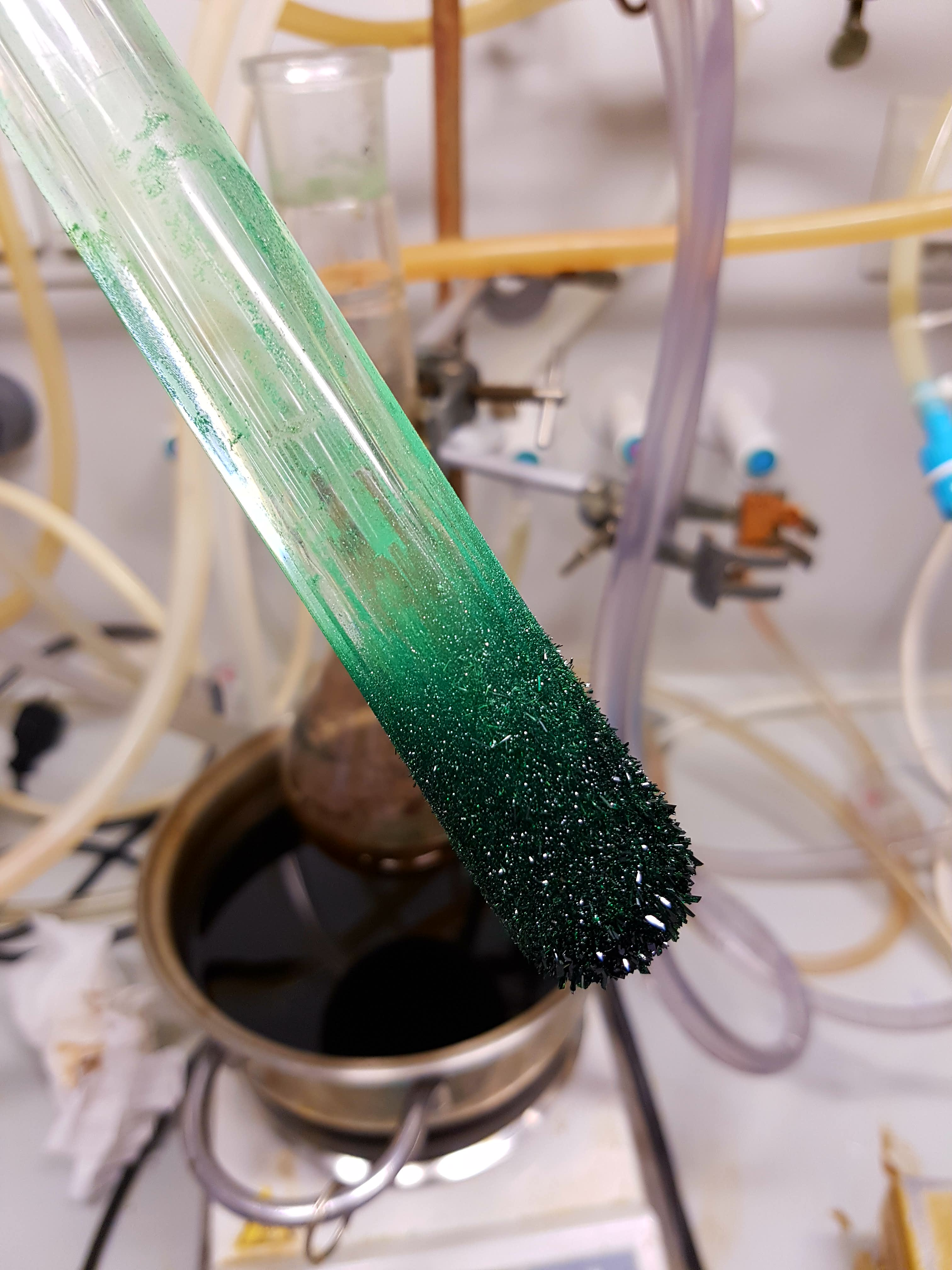
Dark green crystals of nickelocene, sublimed and freshly deposited on a cold finger

Sublimation of iodine

Sublimation is the transition of a substance directly from the solid to the gas state, without passing through the intermediate liquid state. The verb form of sublimation is sublime, or less preferably, sublimate. Sublimate also refers to the product obtained by sublimation. The point at which sublimation occurs rapidly (for definition, see below) is called critical sublimation point, or simply, sublimation point. Notable examples include sublimation of dry ice at room temperature and atmospheric pressure, and that of solid iodine with heating.

The reverse process of sublimation is deposition (also called desublimation), in which a substance passes directly from a gas to a solid phase, without passing through the intermediate liquid state.

Technically, all solids may sublime, though most sublime at extremely low rates that are hardly detectable under usual conditions. At normal pressures, most chemical compounds and elements possess three different states at different temperatures. In these cases, the transition from the solid to the gas state requires an intermediate liquid state. The pressure referred to is the partial pressure of the substance, not the total (e.g. atmospheric) pressure of the entire system. Thus, any solid can sublime if its vapour pressure is higher than the surrounding partial pressure of the same substance, and in some cases, sublimation occurs at an appreciable rate (e.g. water ice just below 0 °C).

For some substances, such as carbon and arsenic, sublimation from solid state is much more achievable than evaporation from liquid state and it is difficult to obtain them as liquids. This is because the pressure of their triple point in its phase diagram (which corresponds to the lowest pressure at which the substance can exist as a liquid) is very high.

Sublimation is caused by the absorption of heat which provides enough energy for some molecules to overcome the attractive forces of their neighbors and escape into the vapor phase. Since the process requires additional energy, sublimation is an endothermic change. The enthalpy of sublimation (also called heat of sublimation) can be calculated by adding the enthalpy of fusion and the enthalpy of vaporization.

== Confusions ==
While the definition of sublimation is simple, there is often confusion as to what counts as a sublimation.

=== False correspondence with vaporization ===
Vaporization (from liquid to gas) is divided into two types: vaporization on the surface of the liquid is called evaporation, and vaporization at the boiling point with formation of bubbles in the interior of the liquid is called boiling. However there is no such distinction for the solid-to-gas transition, which is always called sublimation in both corresponding cases.

==== Potential distinction ====
For clarification, a distinction between the two corresponding cases is needed. With reference to a phase diagram, the sublimation that occurs left of the solid–gas boundary, the triple point or the solid–liquid boundary (corresponding to evaporation in vaporization) may be called gradual sublimation; and the substance sublimes gradually, regardless of rate. The sublimation that occurs at the solid–gas boundary (critical sublimation point) (corresponding to boiling in vaporization) may be called rapid sublimation, and the substance sublimes rapidly. The words "gradual" and "rapid" have acquired special meanings in this context and no longer describe the rate of sublimation.

=== Misuse for chemical reaction ===
The term sublimation refers specifically to a physical change of state and is not used to describe the transformation of a solid to a gas in a chemical reaction. For example, the dissociation on heating of solid ammonium chloride into hydrogen chloride and ammonia is not sublimation but a chemical reaction. Similarly the combustion of candles, containing paraffin wax, to carbon dioxide and water vapor is not sublimation but a chemical reaction with oxygen.

=== Historical definition ===
Sublimation is historically used as a generic term to describe a two-step phase transition – a solid-to-gas transition (sublimation in a more precise definition) followed by a gas-to-solid transition (deposition). (See below)

== Examples ==
Comparison of phase diagrams of carbon dioxide (red) and water (blue) showing the carbon dioxide sublimation point (middle-left) at 1 atmosphere. As dry ice is heated, it crosses this point along the bold horizontal line from the solid phase directly into the gaseous phase. Water, on the other hand, passes through a liquid phase at 1 atmosphere.

The examples shown are substances that noticeably sublime under certain conditions.

=== Carbon dioxide ===
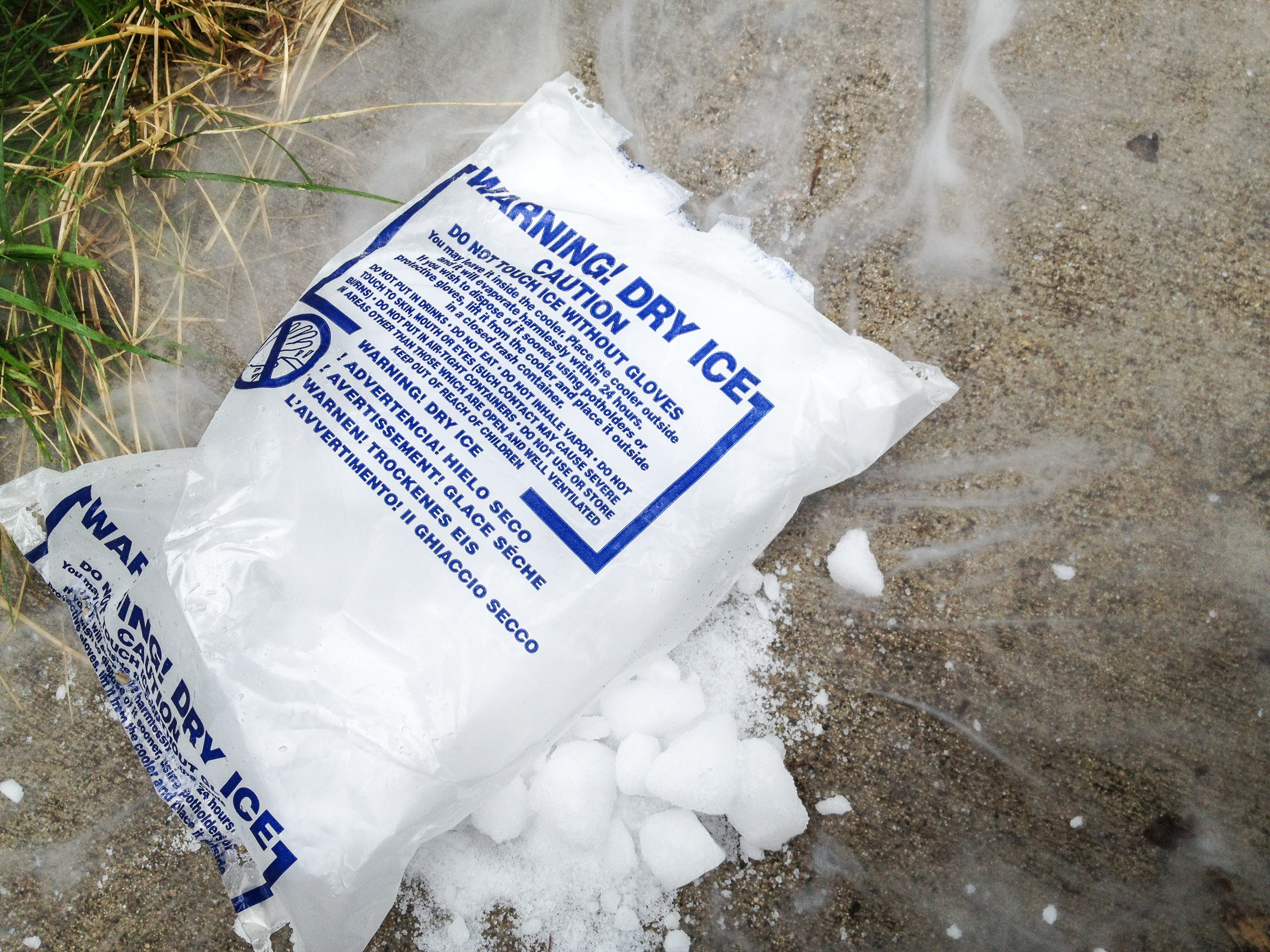
Dry ice subliming in air

Solid carbon dioxide (dry ice) sublimes rapidly along the solid–gas boundary (sublimation point) below the triple point (e.g., at the temperature of −78.5 °C, at atmospheric pressure), whereas its melting into liquid CO_{2} can occur along the solid–liquid boundary (melting point) at pressures and temperatures above the triple point (i.e., 5.1 atm, −56.6 °C).

=== Water ===
Snow and ice sublime gradually at temperatures below the solid–liquid boundary (melting point) (generally 0 °C), and at partial pressures below the triple point pressure of 612 Pa (0.00604 atm), at a low rate. In freeze-drying, the material to be dehydrated is frozen and its water is allowed to sublime under reduced pressure or vacuum. The loss of snow from a snowfield during a cold spell is often caused by sunshine acting directly on the upper layers of the snow. Sublimation of ice is a factor to the erosive wear of glacier ice, known as ablation in glaciology.

=== Naphthalene ===
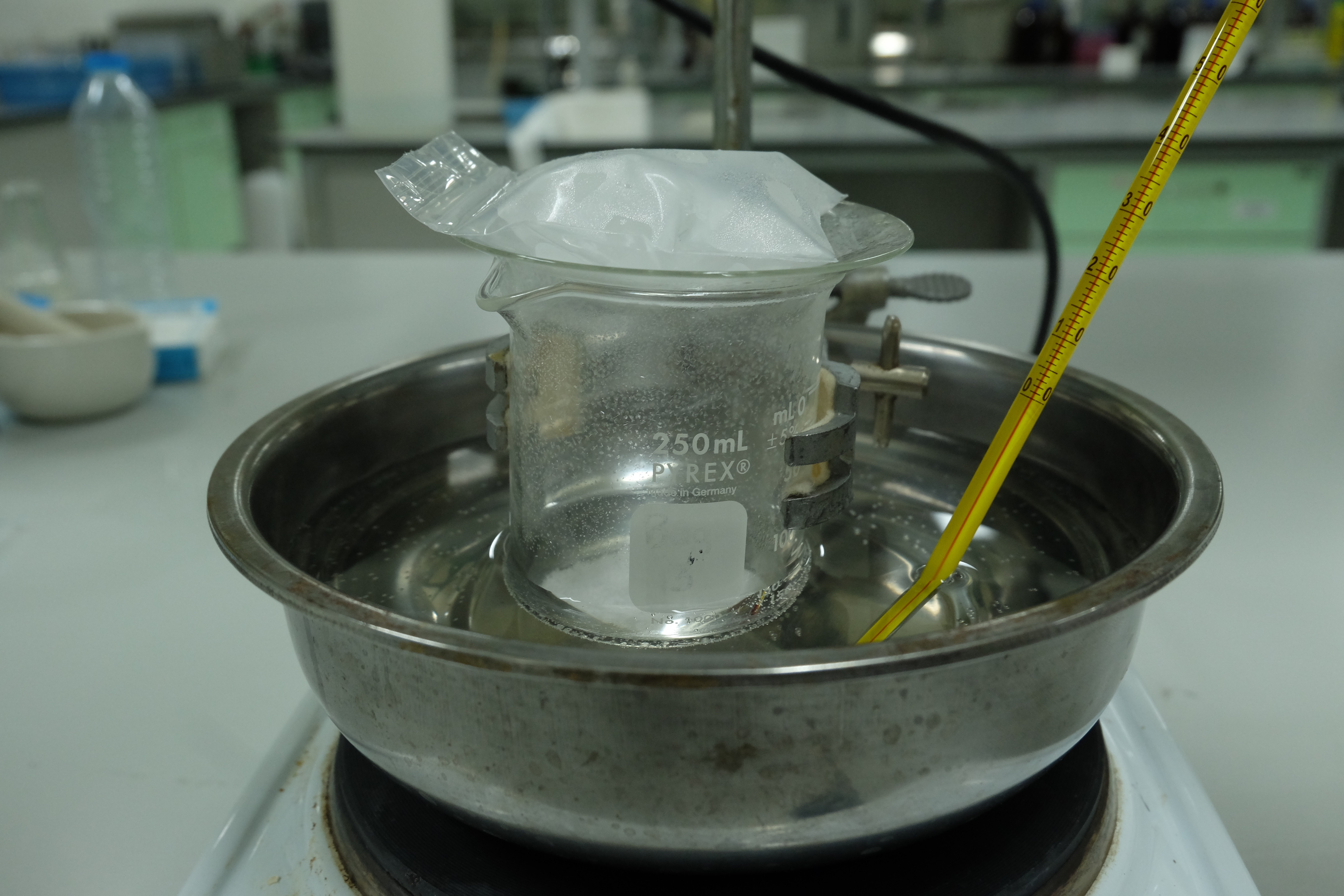
Experimental set up for the sublimation reaction of naphthalene, solid naphthalene sublimes and form the crystal-like structure at the bottom of the watch glass

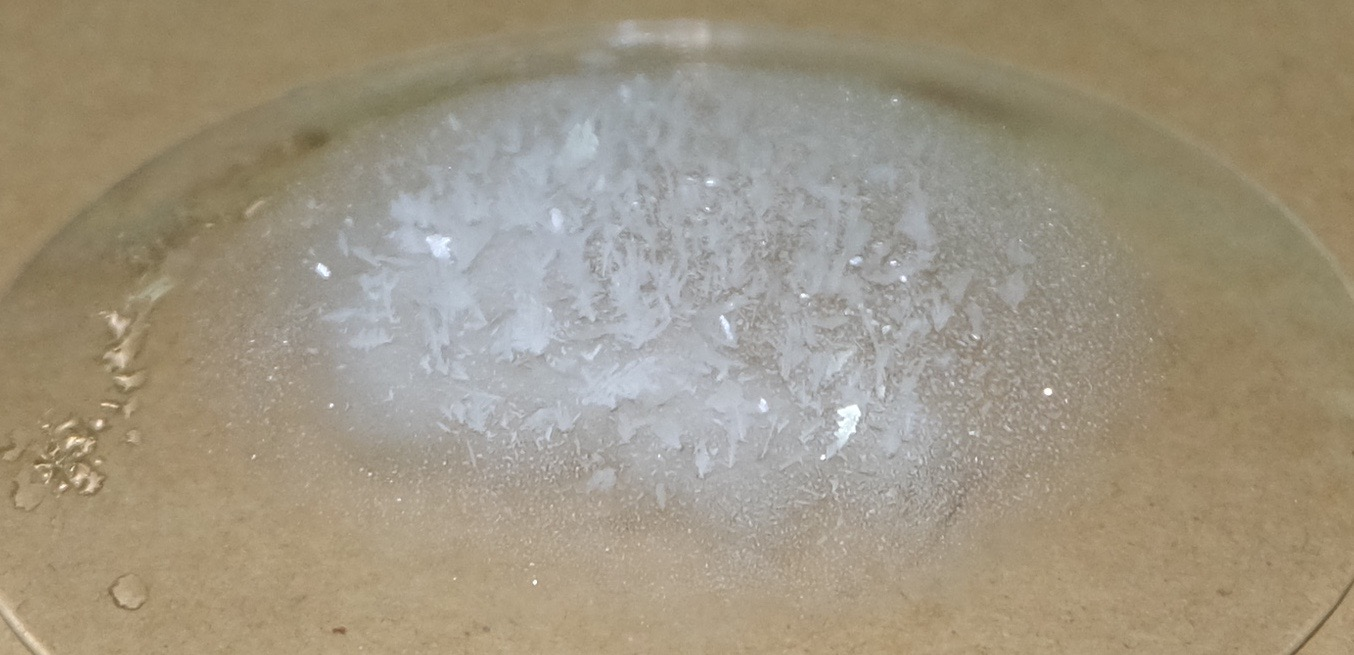
Solid compound of naphthalene sublimed to form a crystal-like structure on the cool surface

Naphthalene, an organic compound commonly found in pesticides such as mothballs, sublimes easily because it is made of non-polar molecules that are held together only by van der Waals intermolecular forces. Naphthalene is a solid that sublimes gradually at standard temperature and pressure, at a high rate, with the critical sublimation point at around 80 °C. At low temperature, its vapour pressure is high enough, 1 mmHg at 53 °C, to make the solid form of naphthalene evaporate into gas. On cool surfaces, the naphthalene vapours will solidify to form needle-like crystals.

=== Iodine ===
Iodine sublimes gradually and produces visible fumes on gentle heating at standard atmospheric temperature. It is possible to obtain liquid iodine at atmospheric pressure by controlling the temperature at just between the melting point and the boiling point of iodine. In forensic science, iodine vapor can reveal latent fingerprints on paper.

=== Other substances ===
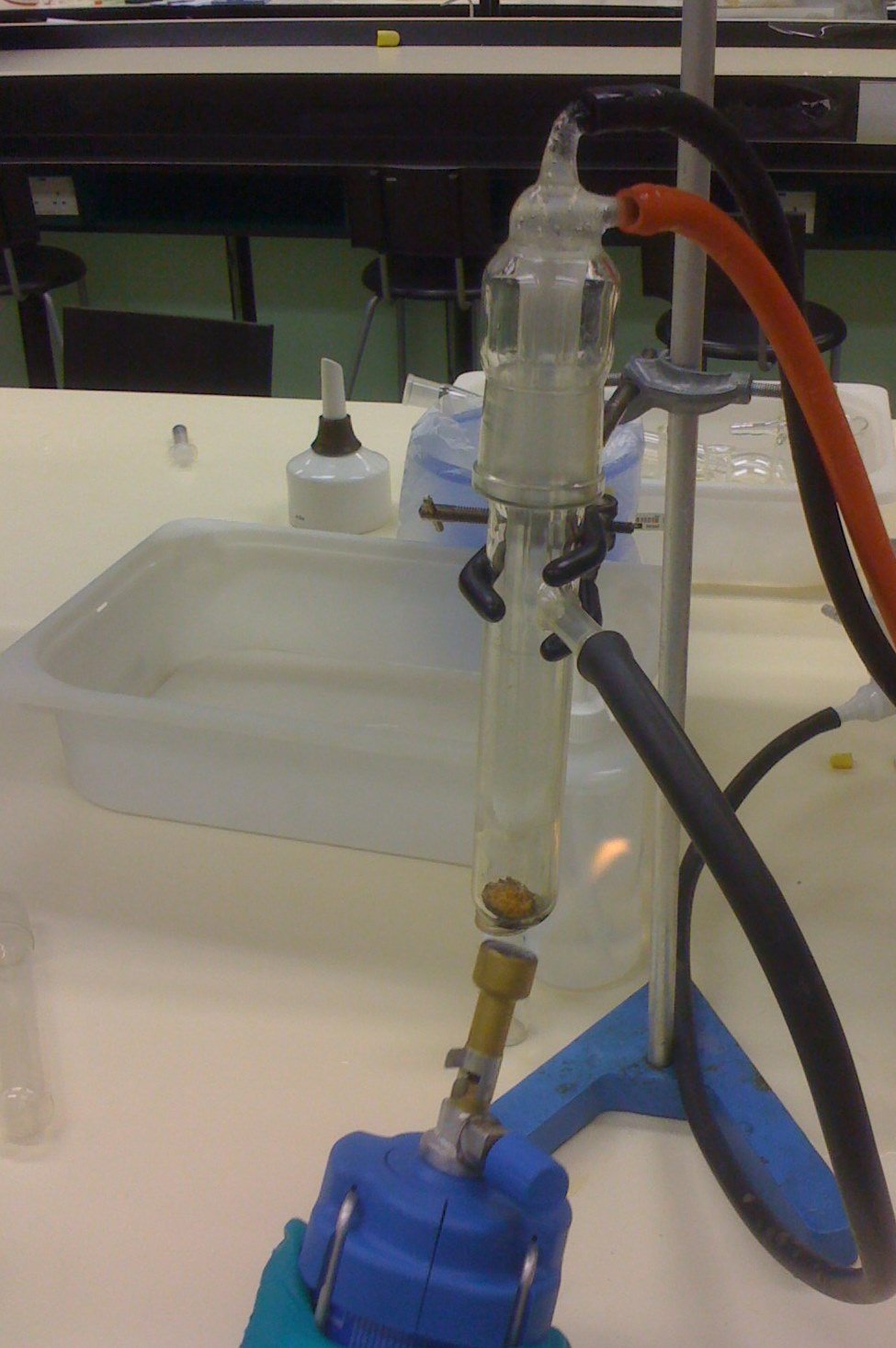
Camphor subliming in a cold finger. The crude product in the bottom is dark brown; the white purified product on the bottom of the cold finger above is hard to see against the light background.

At atmospheric pressure, arsenic sublimes gradually upon heating, and sublimes rapidly at 887 K (614 °C).

Cadmium and zinc sublime much more than other common materials, so they are not suitable materials for use in vacuum.

== Usage ==
=== Purification of compounds ===
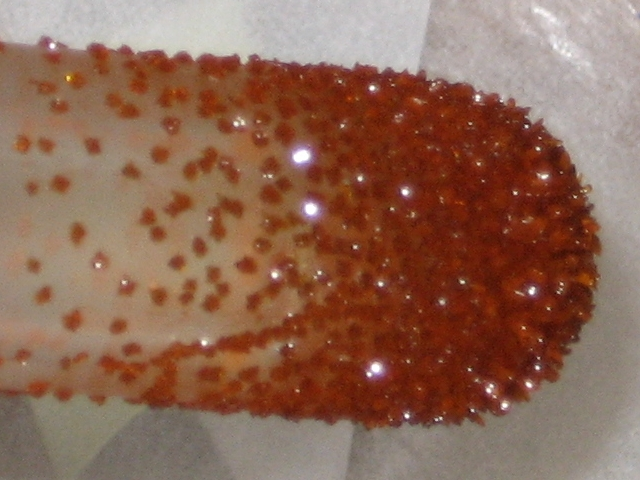
Crystals of ferrocene after purification by vacuum sublimation

Sublimation is a technique used by chemists to purify compounds. A solid is typically placed in a sublimation apparatus and heated under vacuum. Under this reduced pressure, the solid volatilizes and condenses as a purified compound on a cooled surface (cold finger), leaving a non-volatile residue of impurities behind. Once heating ceases and the vacuum is removed, the purified compound may be collected from the cooling surface. For even higher purification efficiencies, a temperature gradient is applied, which also allows for the separation of different fractions. Typical setups use an evacuated glass tube that is heated gradually in a controlled manner. The material flow is from the hot end, where the initial material is placed, to the cold end that is connected to a pump stand. By controlling temperatures along the length of the tube, the operator can control the zones of re-condensation, with very volatile compounds being pumped out of the system completely (or caught by a separate cold trap), moderately volatile compounds re-condensing along the tube according to their different volatilities, and non-volatile compounds remaining in the hot end. Vacuum sublimation of this type is also the method of choice for purification of organic compounds for use in the organic electronics industry, where very high purities (often > 99.99%) are needed to satisfy the standards for consumer electronics and other applications.

== Historical conception ==
In ancient alchemy, a protoscience that contributed to the development of modern chemistry and medicine, alchemists developed a structure of basic laboratory techniques, theory, terminology, and experimental methods. Sublimation was used to refer to the process in which a substance is heated to a vapor, then immediately collects as sediment on the upper portion and neck of the heating medium (typically a retort or alembic), but can also be used to describe other similar non-laboratory transitions. It was mentioned by alchemical authors such as Basil Valentine and George Ripley, and in the Rosarium philosophorum, as a process necessary for the completion of the magnum opus. Here, the word sublimation was used to describe an exchange of "bodies" and "spirits" similar to laboratory phase transition between solids and gases. Valentine, in his Le char triomphal de l'antimoine (Triumphal Chariot of Antimony, published 1646) made a comparison to spagyrics in which a vegetable sublimation can be used to separate the spirits in wine and beer. Ripley used language more indicative of the mystical implications of sublimation, indicating that the process has a double aspect in the spiritualization of the body and the corporalizing of the spirit. He writes:

And Sublimations we make for three causes,
The first cause is to make the body spiritual.
The second is that the spirit may be corporeal,
And become fixed with it and consubstantial.
The third cause is that from its filthy original
It may be cleansed, and its saltiness sulphurious
May be diminished in it, which is infectious.

== Enthalpy change ==
The enthalpy of sublimation has commonly been predicted using the equipartition theorem. If the lattice energy is assumed to be approximately half the packing energy, then the following thermodynamic corrections can be applied to predict the enthalpy of sublimation. Assuming a 1 molar ideal gas gives a correction for the thermodynamic environment (pressure and volume) in which pV = RT, hence a correction of 1RT. Additional corrections for the vibrations, rotations and translation then need to be applied. From the equipartition theorem gaseous rotation and translation contribute 1.5RT each to the final state, therefore a +3RT correction. Crystalline vibrations and rotations contribute 3RT each to the initial state, hence −6RT. Summing the RT corrections; −6RT + 3RT + RT = −2RT. This leads to the following approximate sublimation enthalpy. A similar approximation can be found for the entropy term if rigid bodies are assumed. $\Delta H_{\text{sublimation}} = -U_{\text{lattice energy}} - 2RT$

== Table of phase transitions of matter ==
Phase transitions of matter
To From	Solid	Liquid	Gas	Plasma
Solid		Melting	Sublimation	ablation
Liquid	Freezing		Vaporization	
Gas	Deposition	Condensation		Ionization
Plasma			Recombination	

== See also ==
- Ablation
- Dye-sublimation printing
- Enthalpy of sublimation
- Freeze-drying
- Freezer burn – Common process involving sublimation
- Phase diagram
- Phase transitions
