= Porter Chemical Company =

American toy manufacturer

- Industry: Toys and hobbies
- Founded: 1916
- Headquarters: Hagerstown, Maryland
- Key people: Harold M. Porter (Owner); John J. Porter
- Products: Chemistry sets

Porter Chemical Company was an American toy manufacturer that developed and produced chemistry sets aimed as educational toys for aspiring junior scientists. The company's Chemcraft kits were first sold at major retail by Woodward & Lothrop, and appeared soon after at other retailers in the country.

The company would later form a relationship with the Lionel Corporation, famed American maker of toy trains. The company also made the Microcraft line of microscope sets. The Chemcraft and Microcraft line competed with similar sets offered by A. C. Gilbert Company as part of a boom in science educational toys spurred by the Space Race between the US and USSR in the late 1950s.

In 1951, the company's top-of-the-line "Chemcraft Master Laboratory" set retailed for $27.50 ($equivalent to $341 in 2025) and contained, among other things, radioactive Uranium ore.

At the peak of its success, Porter Chemical Company was the biggest user of test tubes in the USA. The company produced over a million sets before increasing consumer liability concerns led to its demise in the 1980s.
