= Cold finger =

Laboratory equipment for generating a cold surface

Cold finger used in sublimation. The raw product (6) is in the bottom of the outer tube (4) which is heated (7) while under vacuum (through side-arm 3). The sublimated material collects (5) on the cold finger proper, cooled by a coolant (blue) circulated through ports 1 and 2.

A cold finger is a piece of laboratory equipment that is used to generate a localized cold surface. It is named for its resemblance to a finger and is a type of cold trap. The device usually consists of a chamber that a coolant fluid (cold tap water, or perhaps something colder) can enter and leave. Another version involves filling the device with a cold material (examples: ice, dry ice or a mixture such as dry ice/acetone or ice/water).

Typically a cold finger is used in a sublimation apparatus, or can be used as a compact version of a condenser in either reflux reaction or distillation apparatus. Many commercially available rotary evaporators can be purchased with a cold finger in place of a Dimroth condenser, for example. When used as a condenser in a rotary evaporator, cold fingers can be cooled to a lower temperature of −78 °C (dry ice), compared with water condensers that can be cooled to −40 °C (ethylene glycol/water mixture). The lower temperature achieved reduces the quantity of volatile material exhausted into the air.

== Media ==
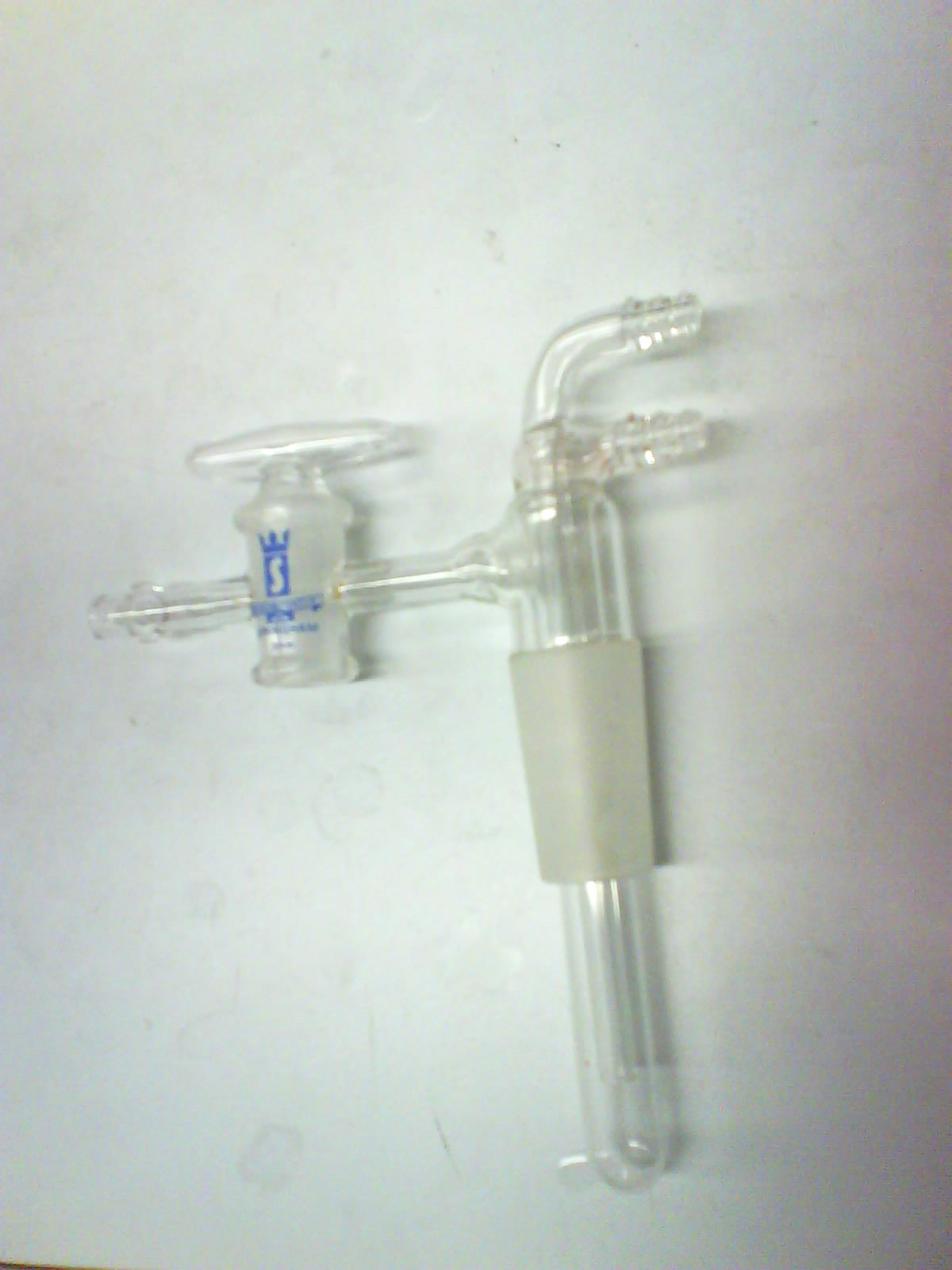
A cold finger which includes a vacuum outlet.

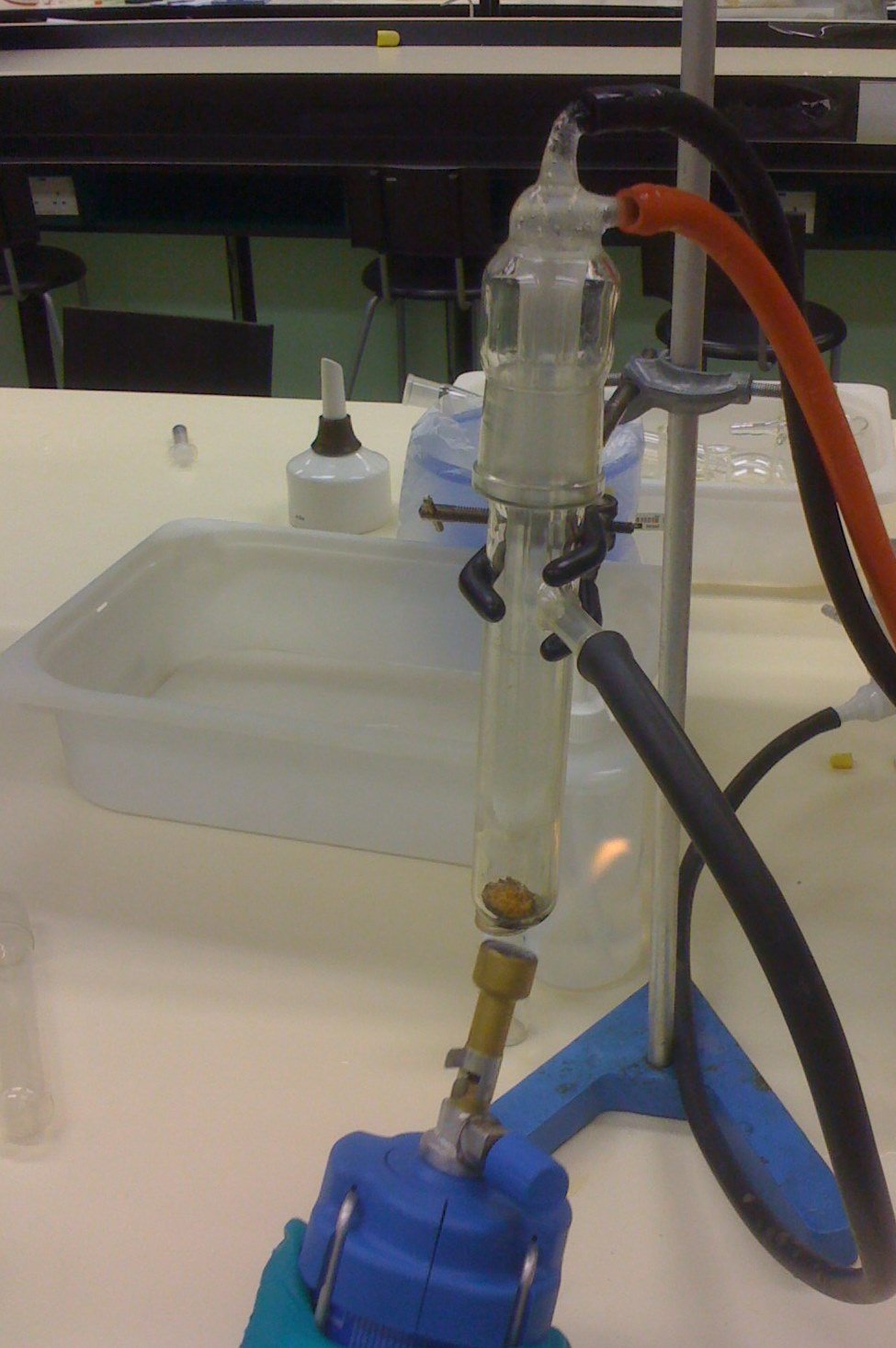
Camphor being sublimed. The crude product in the bottom is dark brown; the white purified product on the bottom of the cold finger above is hard to see against the light background.

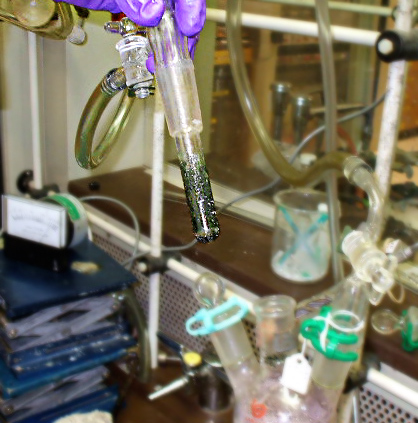
Dark green crystals of nickelocene, freshly sublimed on a cold finger.
