= Salter Science =

Brand of science kits

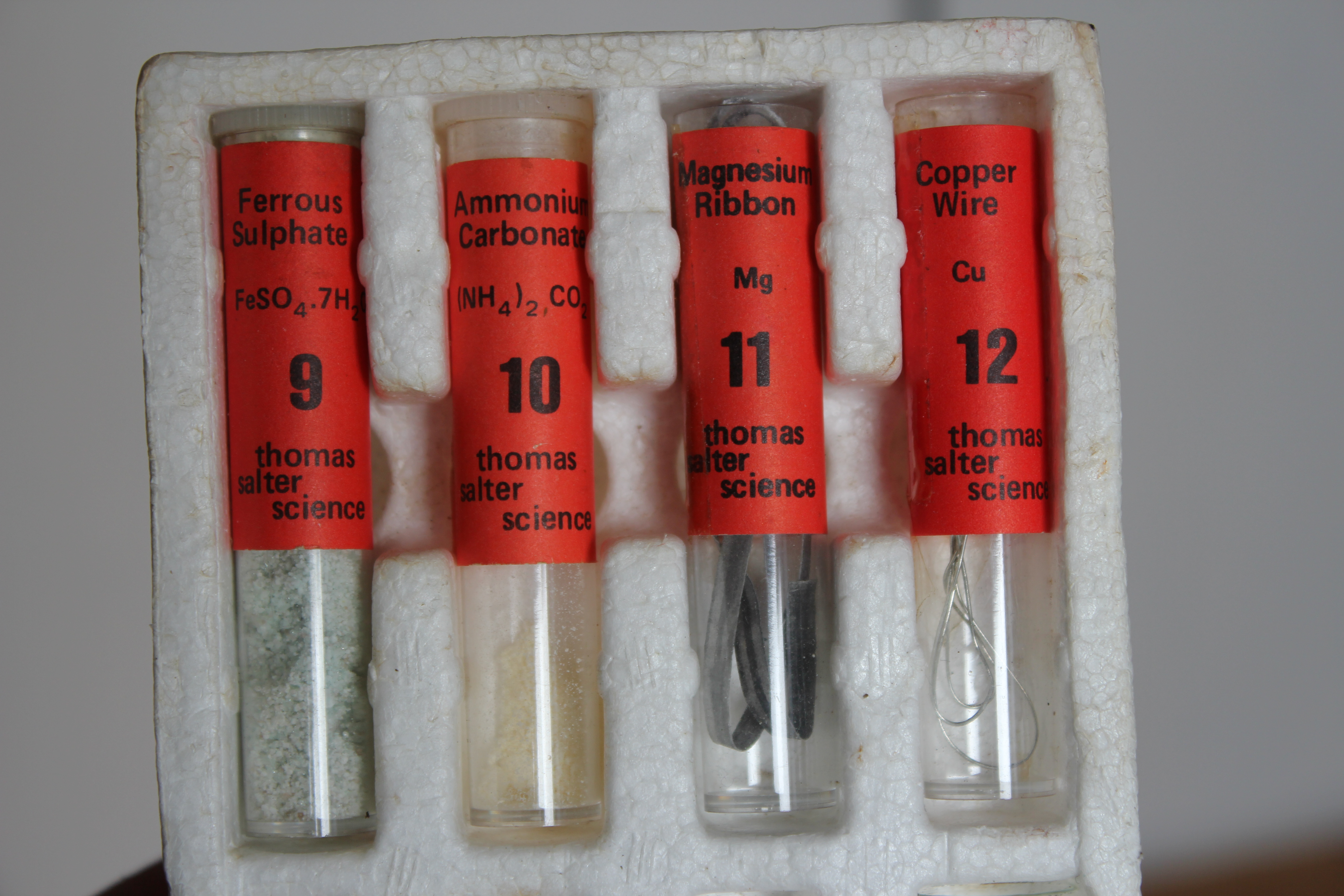
A selection of chemicals included in the chemistry set "Chemistry 4" from Salter Science.

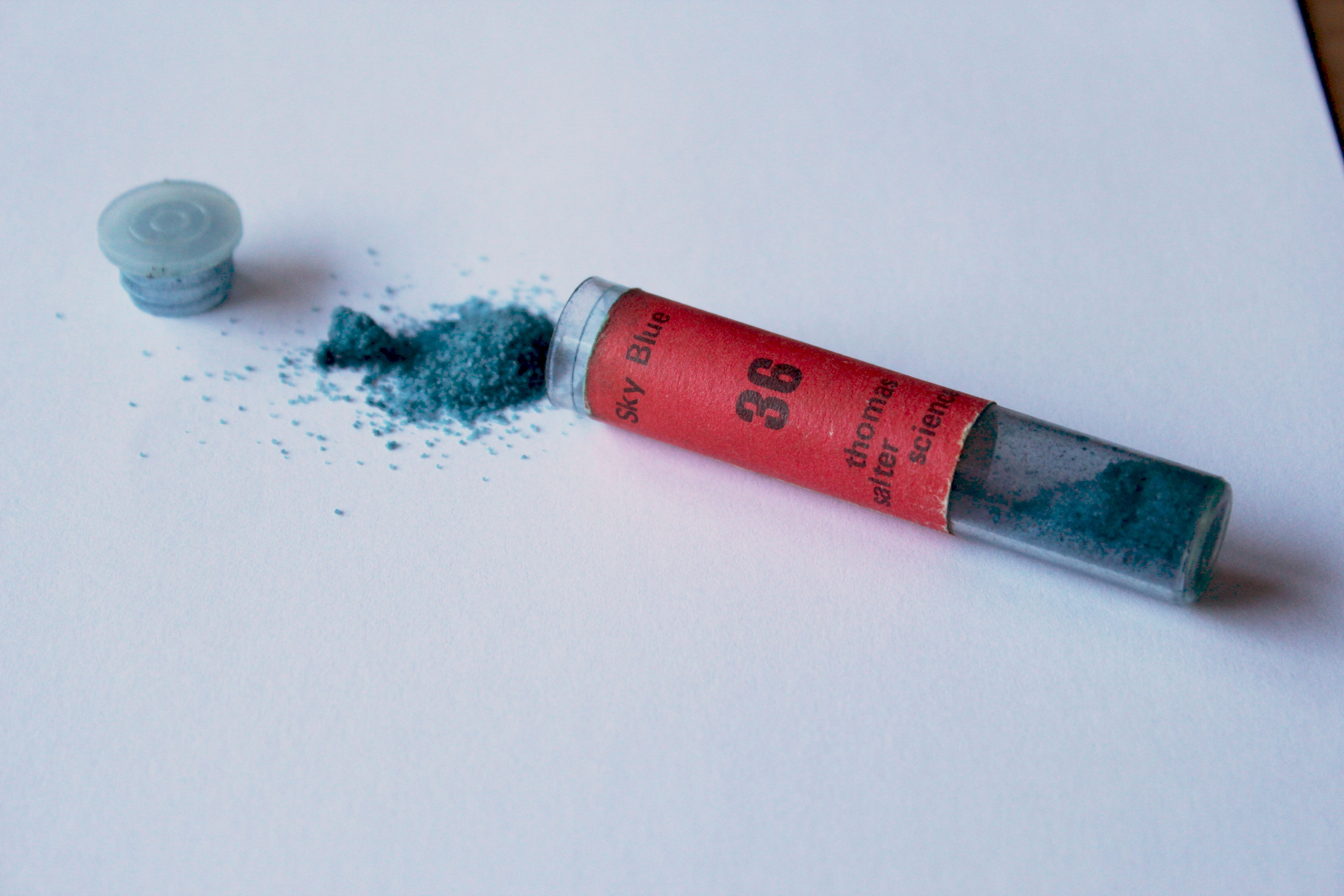
Some of the chemistry sets produced by Salter Science contained this tube of Patent Blue V, under the name of "Sky Blue". The dye colors water blue, but turns green in acidic solutions.

Salter Science was a brand of science kits sold by Thomas Salter Ltd., a Scotland-based company which manufactured toys and science activity kits for children. Kits included activities with electricity, microscopy, magnetism and crystal gardens, but the company is probably best known for their chemistry sets. The company also produced other items such as an "Adventure Kit" consisting of a water bottle, compass, toy binoculars and a real working camera. Some toys were related to TV series, such as the 'KOJAK' ACTION PACK and the PROFESSIONALS CRIMEBUSTER KIT. It also produced crafts plaster moulding sets Frog & Owl.

Thomas Salter Ltd. was founded in London in 1913, moved to Glenrothes, Fife, and closed in 1992.

Chemistry sets from Salter Science included a various number of chemicals, which were numbered, so that the numbers were the same across the sets. Some of the chemicals included were:

1. Copper sulfate
2. Sodium carbonate
3. Calcium oxychloride
4. Iron filings
5. Calcium hydroxide
6. Sodium hydrogen sulfate
7. Tartaric acid
8. Methyl orange
9. Ferrous sulfate
10. Ammonium carbonate
11. Magnesium ribbon
12. Copper wire
13. Ammonium chloride
14. Sodium thiosulfate
15. Sodium perborate
16. Cobalt chloride
17. Potassium iodide
18. Soluble starch
19. Potassium iodate
20. Sodium metabisulfite
21. Carbon rods
22. Sodium silicate
23. Potassium persulfate
24. Potassium chromate
25. Zinc granulated
26. Borax
27. Iron alum
36. Sky Blue
38. Ion-exchange resin
39. Magnesium sulfate
41. Activated charcoal

Also commonly included were small glass test tubes, a spatula, a funnel, corks with and without holes, glass tubes that would fit in the cork holes, a tiny glass saw to cut the tubes, a small bottle brush, test tube racks and a methylated spirit burner for heating.

The instruction manual told how to heat the glass tubes to make them bend, and also how to make them stretch and cut them in half using the glass saw in the middle of the stretch to make two pipettes.
