= Patent Blue V =

- Chemical structure

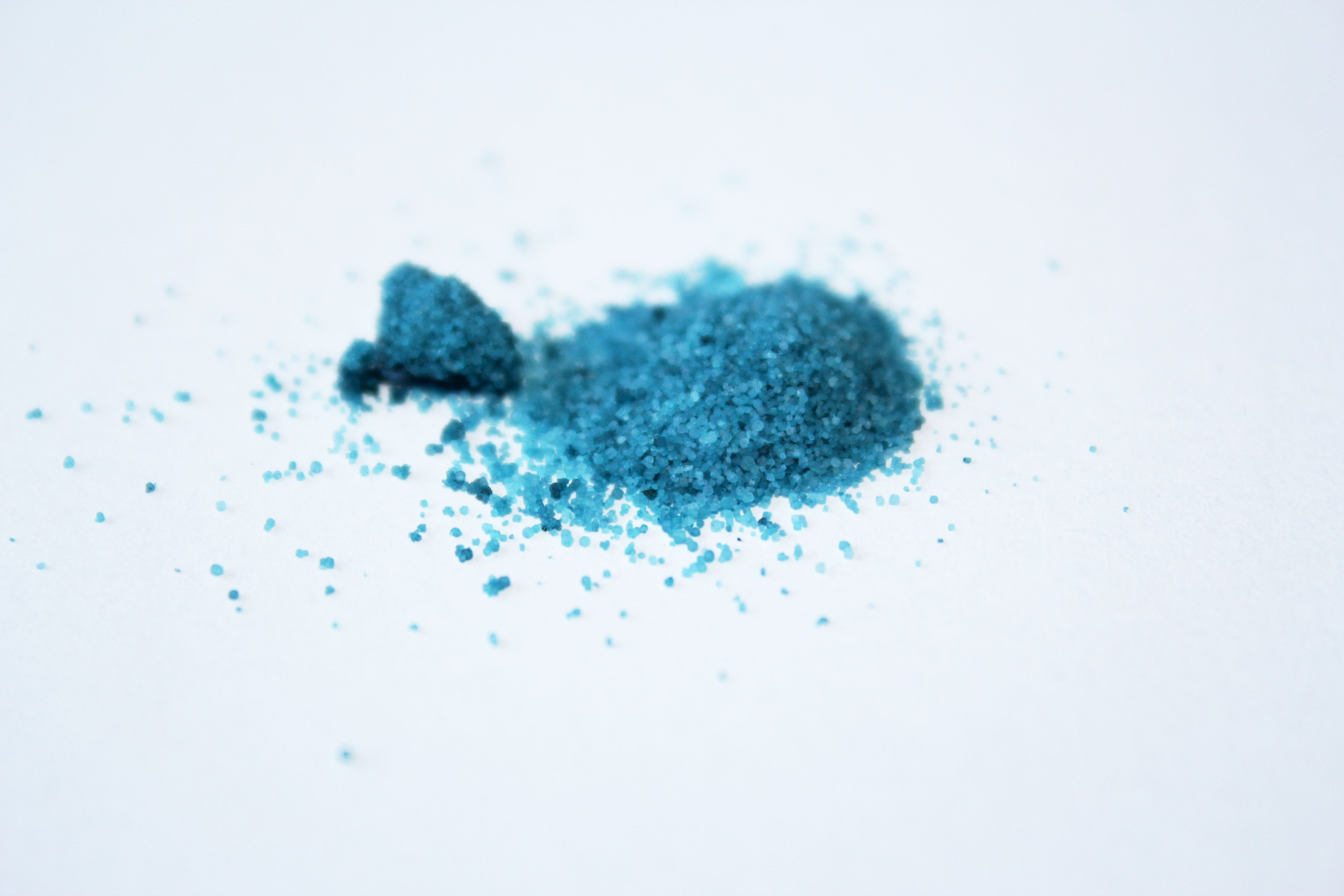
- Crystals

Names
- Other names: Food Blue 5; Sulphan Blue; Acid Blue 3; L-Blau 3; C-Blau 20; Patentblau V; Sky Blue; C.I. 42051; E 131

Identifiers
CAS Number	3536-49-0
3D model (JSmol)	Interactive image
ChEBI	CHEBI:59601
ChemSpider	69520
ECHA InfoCard	100.020.522
EC Number	243-654-4; Calcium salt: 222-573-8
E number	E131 (colours)
KEGG	Calcium salt: D11704
PubChem CID	77074; Calcium salt: 77073
UNII	8QE473DV1Z
CompTox Dashboard (EPA)	DTXSID00873918 DTXSID50942380, DTXSID00873918
- InChI: InChI=1S/C27H32N2O7S2/c1-5-28(6-2)21-13-9-19(10-14-21)27(20-11-15-22(16-12-20)29(7-3)8-4)23-17-24(30)26(38(34,35)36)18-25(23)37(31,32)33/h9-18H,5-8H2,1-4H3,(H2-,30,31,32,33,34,35,36)/p+1 Key: DHAHKSQXIXFZJB-UHFFFAOYSA-O; InChI=1/C27H32N2O7S2/c1-5-28(6-2)21-13-9-19(10-14-21)27(20-11-15-22(16-12-20)29(7-3)8-4)23-17-24(30)26(38(34,35)36)18-25(23)37(31,32)33/h9-18H,5-8H2,1-4H3,(H2-,30,31,32,33,34,35,36)/p+1 Key: DHAHKSQXIXFZJB-IKLDFBCSAW
- SMILES: CCN(CC)c1ccc(cc1)C(=C2C=CC(=[N+](CC)CC)C=C2)c3cc(c(cc3S(=O)(=O)O)S(=O)(=O)O)O

Pharmacology
ATC code	V04CX09 (WHO)
- Except where otherwise noted, data are given for materials in their standard state (at 25 °C [77 °F], 100 kPa). Infobox references

Patent Blue V, also called Food Blue 5, Sulphan Blue, Acid Blue 3, L-Blau 3, C-Blau 20, Patentblau V, Sky Blue, or C.I. 42051, is a sky blue synthetic triphenylmethane dye used as a food coloring. As a food additive, it has E number E131. It is a sodium or calcium salt of [4-(α-(4-diethylaminophenyl)-5-hydroxy- 2,4-disulfophenylmethylidene)-2,5-cyclohexadien-1-ylidene] diethylammonium hydroxide inner salt.

== Use as dye ==
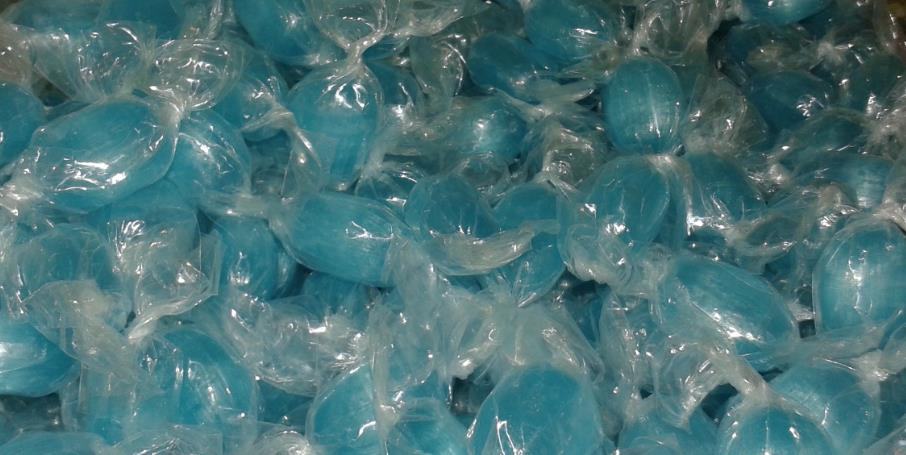
Candies with Patent Blue V (E131) added

In Europe, it is currently approved for preserves of red fruit only. An important advantage is the very deep color it produces even at low concentration; a disadvantage is that it fades fairly quickly when exposed to light.

In medicine, Patent Blue V is used in lymphangiography and sentinel node biopsy as a dye to color lymph vessels. It is also used in dental disclosing tablets as a stain to show dental plaque on teeth.

The color of the dye is pH-dependent. In aqueous solution, its color will vary from a deep blue in alkaline or weakly acidic medium to a yellow–orange in stronger acidic conditions. It is useful as a pH indicator for the range 0.8–3.0. The structure is also redox-sensitive, changing from a reduced yellow form to an oxidized red form in solution. The reduction potential of around 0.77 volts is similar to that of other triphenylmethane dyes. It is usable as a reversible redox indicator in some analytical methods.

Because of its pH-dependent color, Patent Blue V was included in chemistry sets from Salter Science in the 1970s and 80s under the name Sky Blue.

== Regulation ==
Patent Blue V is banned as a food dye in Australia, Canada, and US, because health officials in these countries suspect that it may cause allergic reactions, with symptoms ranging from itching and nettle rash to nausea, hypotension, and in rare cases anaphylactic shock; it is therefore not recommended in those countries for children.

It is currently approved in the European Union and UK.
