= Sublimatory =

Equipment for purifying a substance by selective sublimation

Simple sublimation apparatus. Water usually cold, is circulated in cold finger to allow the desired compound to be deposited. 1 Cooling water entrance 2 Cooling water exit 3 Vacuum/gas line 4 Sublimation chamber 5 Sublimed compound 6 Crude material 7 External heating

A sublimatory or sublimation apparatus is equipment, commonly laboratory glassware, for purification of compounds by selective sublimation. In principle, the operation resembles purification by distillation, except that the products do not pass through a liquid phase.

== Overview ==
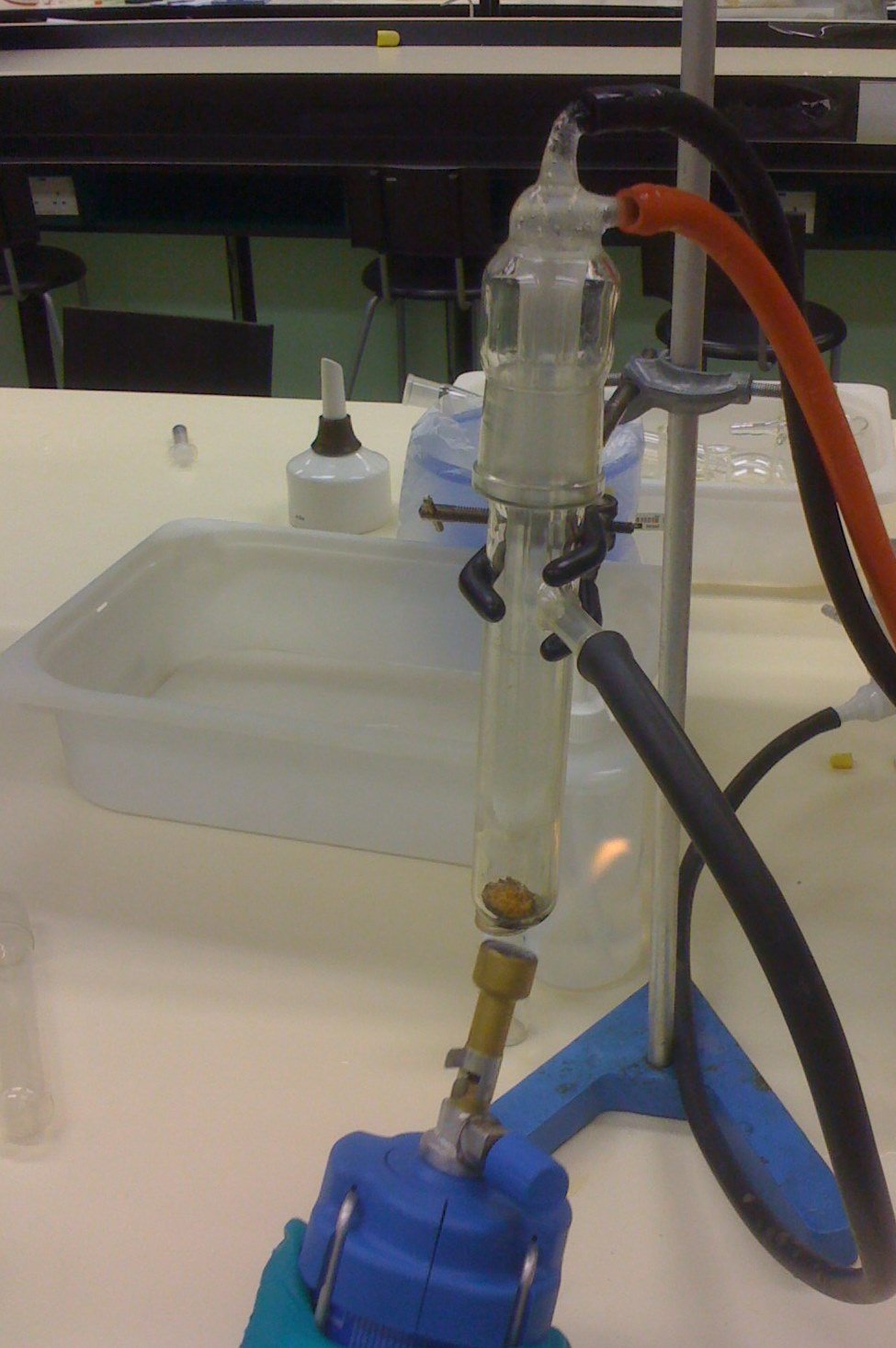
Camphor being purified on a sublimation apparatus. Note the white purified camphor on the cold finger, and the dark-brown crude product.

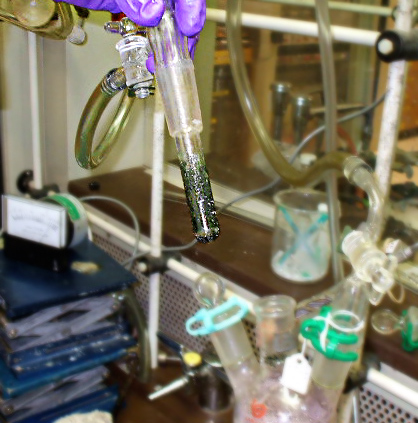
Dark green crystals of nickelocene, freshly sublimed on the cold finger of the sublimation apparatus.

A typical sublimation apparatus separates a mix of appropriate solid materials in a vessel in which it applies heat under a controllable atmosphere (air, vacuum or inert gas). If the material is not at first solid, then it may freeze under reduced pressure. Conditions are so chosen that the solid volatilizes and condenses as a purified compound on a cooled surface, leaving the non-volatile residual impurities or solid products behind.

The form of the cooled surface often is a so-called cold finger which for very low-temperature sublimation may actually be cryogenically cooled. If the operation is a batch process, then the sublimed material can be collected from the cooled surface once heating ceases and the vacuum is released. Although this may be quite convenient for small quantities, adapting sublimation processes to large volume is generally not practical with the apparatus becoming extremely large and generally needing to be disassembled to recover products and remove residue.

Among the advantages of applying the principle to certain materials are the comparatively low working temperatures, reduced exposure to gases such as oxygen that might harm certain products, and the ease with which it can be performed on extremely small quantities. The same apparatus may also be used for conventional distillation of extremely small quantities due to the very small volume and surface area between evaporating and condensing regions, although this is generally only useful if the cold finger can be cold enough to solidify the condensate.

== Temperature gradient ==
More sophisticated variants of sublimation apparatus include those that apply a temperature gradient so as to allow for controlled recrystallization of different fractions along the cold surface. Thermodynamic processes follow a statistical distribution, and suitably designed apparatus exploit this principle with a gradient that will yield different purities in particular temperature zones along the collection surface. Such techniques are especially helpful when the requirement is to refine or separate multiple products or impurities from the same mix of raw materials. It is necessary in particular when some of the required products have similar sublimation points or pressure curves.

== See also ==
- Distillation
- List of purification methods in chemistry
