= Beaker (laboratory equipment) =

Glass container used in laboratories

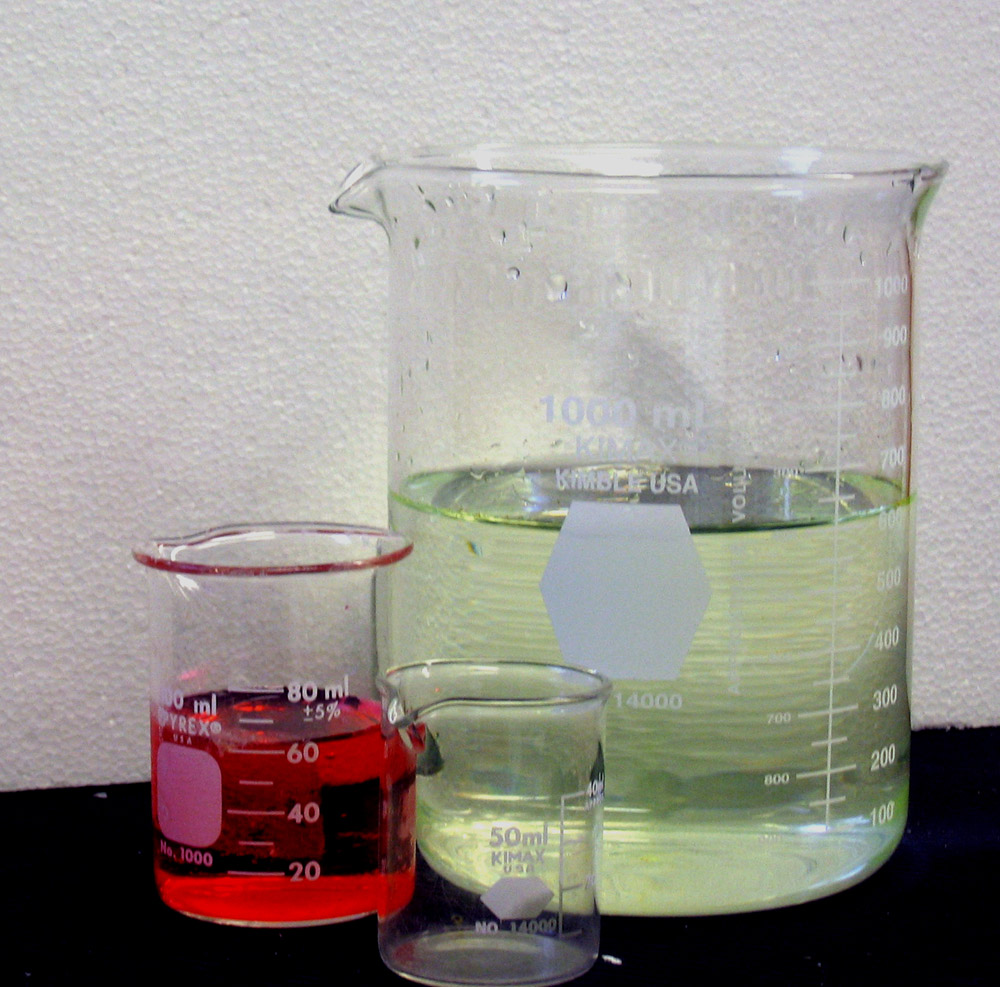
- Beakers of several sizes
- Uses: Liquid volume containment and measurement
- Related items: Laboratory flask

In laboratory equipment, a beaker is generally a cylindrical container with a flat bottom. Most also have a small spout (or "beak") to aid pouring, as shown in the picture. Beakers are available in a wide range of sizes, from one milliliter up to several liters. A beaker is distinguished from a flask by having straight rather than sloping sides. The exception to this definition is a slightly conical-sided beaker called a Philips beaker. The beaker shape in general drinkware is similar.

Beakers are commonly made of glass (today usually borosilicate glass), but can also be in metal (such as stainless steel or aluminum) or certain plastics (notably polythene, polypropylene, PTFE). A common use for polypropylene beakers is gamma spectral analysis of liquid and solid samples.

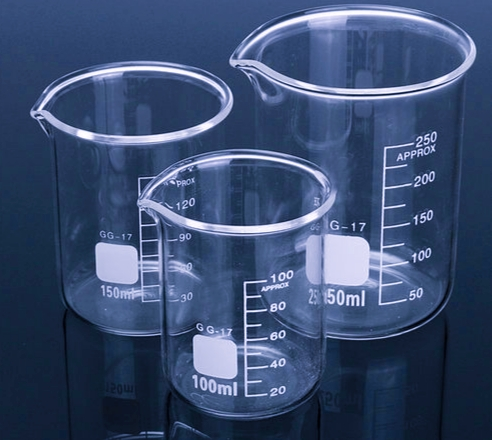
Beakers of different sizes

== Construction and use ==
(A) A low-form or Griffin form beaker (B) A tall-form or Berzelius beaker (C) A flat beaker or crystallizer

Philips beaker which can be swirled like a conical flask

Standard or "low-form" (A) beakers typically have a height about 1.4 times the diameter. The common low form with a spout was devised by John Joseph Griffin and is therefore sometimes called a Griffin beaker. These are the most universal character and are used for various purposes—from preparing solutions and decanting supernatant fluids to holding waste fluids prior to disposal to performing simple reactions. Low form beakers are likely to be used in some way when performing a chemical experiment. "Tall-form" (B) beakers have a height about twice their diameter. These are sometimes called Berzelius beakers, after Jöns Jacob Berzelius, and are mostly used for titration. Flat beakers (C) are often called "crystallizers" because most are used to perform crystallization, but they are also often used as a vessel for use in hot-bath heating. These beakers usually do not have a flat scale.

The presence of a spout means that the beaker cannot have a lid. However, when in use, beakers may be covered by a watch glass to prevent contamination or loss of the contents, but allowing venting via the spout. Alternatively, a beaker may be covered with another larger beaker that has been inverted, though a watch glass is preferable.

Beakers are often graduated, that is, marked on the side with lines indicating the volume contained. For instance, a 250 mL beaker might be marked with lines to indicate 50, 100, 150, 200, and 250 mL of volume. These marks are not intended for obtaining a precise measurement of volume (a graduated cylinder or a volumetric flask would be a more appropriate instrument for such a task), but rather an estimation. Most beakers are accurate to within ~10%.

== Standards ==
DIN EN ISO 3819:2015-12 defines the following types and sizes:

| Type | Nominal volume (ml) | Outer diameter (mm) ±5% | Overall height (mm) max. | Wall thickness (mm) min. |
|---|---|---|---|---|
| Low high beaker | 5 | 22 | 32 | 0.7 |
| | 10 | 26 | 37 | 0.7 |
| | 25 | 34 | 52 | 0.7 |
| | 50 | 42 | 62 | 0.8 |
| | 100 | 50 | 72 | 0.9 |
| | 150 | 60 | 82 | 1.0 |
| | 250 | 70 | 97 | 1.1 |
| | 400 | 80 | 113 | 1.2 |
| | 500 | 85 | 118 | 1.3 |
| | 600 | 90 | 128 | 1.3 |
| | 800 | 100 | 138 | 1.3 |
| | 1000 | 105 | 148 | 1.3 |
| | 2000 | 130 | 188 | 1.4 |
| | 3000 | 150 | 214 | 1.7 |
| | 5000 | 170 | 274 | 2.0 |
| | 10000 | 220 | 360 | 2.0 |
| High beaker | 50 | 38 | 72 | 0.8 |
| | 100 | 48 | 82 | 0.9 |
| | 150 | 54 | 97 | 1.0 |
| | 250 | 60 | 123 | 1.1 |
| | 400 | 70 | 133 | 1.2 |
| | 500 | 79 | 140 | 1.3 |
| | 600 | 80 | 153 | 1.3 |
| | 800 | 90 | 178 | 1.3 |
| | 1000 | 95 | 183 | 1.3 |
| | 2000 | 120 | 244 | 1.4 |
| | 3000 | 135 | 284 | 1.7 |
| | 5000 | 160 | 324 | 2.0 |
| Thick wall type | 150 | 60 | 82 | 1.11 |
| | 250 | 70 | 97 | 1.2 |
| | 400 | 80 | 111 | 1.4 |
| | 600 | 90 | 127 | 1.4 |
| | 1000 | 105 | 147 | 1.4 |
| | 2000 | 132 | 187 | 1.5 |
| | 5000 | 170 | 275 | 2.5 |

== See also ==
- Beaker (drinkware)
- Beaker (archaeology)
- Beaker (disambiguation)
- Volumetric flask
- Schott bottle
- Stirring rod
- Test tube
- Graduated cylinder
- Scoop
