= John Joseph Griffin =

English chemist and publisher

John Joseph Griffin (1802 – 9 June 1877) was an English chemist and publisher.

== Life ==
Griffin was born in 1802 in Shoreditch, London, the son of a bookseller and publisher. The family moved to Glasgow when he was young. In present-day his family members still live in, Although some are spread out in Yorkshire and Grimsby, England, and he studied at the Andersonian Institution. He also received training in chemistry at Paris and at Heidelberg.

In 1832 he married Mary Ann Holder, with whom he had twelve children, including William Griffin, FCS, and Charles Griffin, FSA. Griffin died at his residence, Park Road, Haverstock Hill, on 9 June 1877.

== Works ==
Griffin commenced business in Glasgow as a bookseller, publisher, and dealer in chemical apparatus, in partnership with his eldest brother. While still a young man he published a translation of Heinrich Rose's Handbuch der analytischen Chemie. Griffin also partly edited the Encyclopædia Metropolitana, of which his firm were the publishers.

In 1852 the partnership was dissolved, with the publishing branch being continued by his nephew (as Charles Griffin & Co.) and J. J. Griffin establishing a firm of chemical apparatus dealers (J. J. Griffin & Sons). By the 1860s this company had established a shop on Bunhill Row and later Long Acre in London, selling both self-made and imported equipment. Through a series of mergers the company was later to develop into the major apparatus supplier Griffin & George.

Griffin devised many new forms of chemical apparatus, including the common style of beaker which sometimes bears his name, and did much in introducing scientific methods into commercial processes.

He was earnest in his attempts to popularise the study of chemistry, and in 1823 published his book Chemical Recreations: a popular manual of experimental chemistry, which was highly successful and went through several editions. Other books he authored include:

- 1827: A Practical Treatise on the Use of the Blowpipe via Google Books
- 1841: System of Crystallography
- 1858: The Radical Theory in Chemistry
- Centigrade Testing as applied to the Arts
- 1866: The Chemical Testing of Wines and Spirits, 2nd edition 1872
- 1866: Chemical Handicraft, 2nd edition 1877

Griffin assisted in the foundation of the Chemical Society in 1840, and also helped to revive the Glasgow Philosophical Society.

Nine of Griffin's papers appeared in various scientific periodicals. Of these the first was On a New Method of Crystallographic Notation; Report British Association, 1840, p. 88; and the last A Description of a Patent Blast Gas Furnace, Chemical News, 1860, pp. 27, 40.
