= Watch glass =

Piece of laboratory glassware

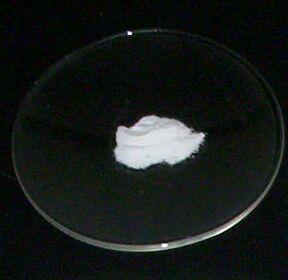
Caesium fluoride sample on a watch glass

A watch glass is a circular concave piece of glass used in chemistry as a surface to evaporate a liquid, to hold solids while being weighed, for heating a small amount of substance, and as a cover for a beaker. When used to cover beakers, the purpose is generally to prevent dust or other particles from entering the beaker; the watch glass does not completely seal the beaker, so gas exchanges still occur. When used as an evaporation surface, a watch glass allows closer observation of precipitates or crystallization. It can be placed on a surface of contrasting colors to improve the visibility overall. Watch glasses are also sometimes used to cover a glass of whisky, to concentrate the aromas in the glass, and to prevent spills when the whisky is swirled. Watch glasses are named so because they are similar to the glass used for the front of old-fashioned pocket watches. These large watch glasses are occasionally known as clock glasses.

== Uses ==
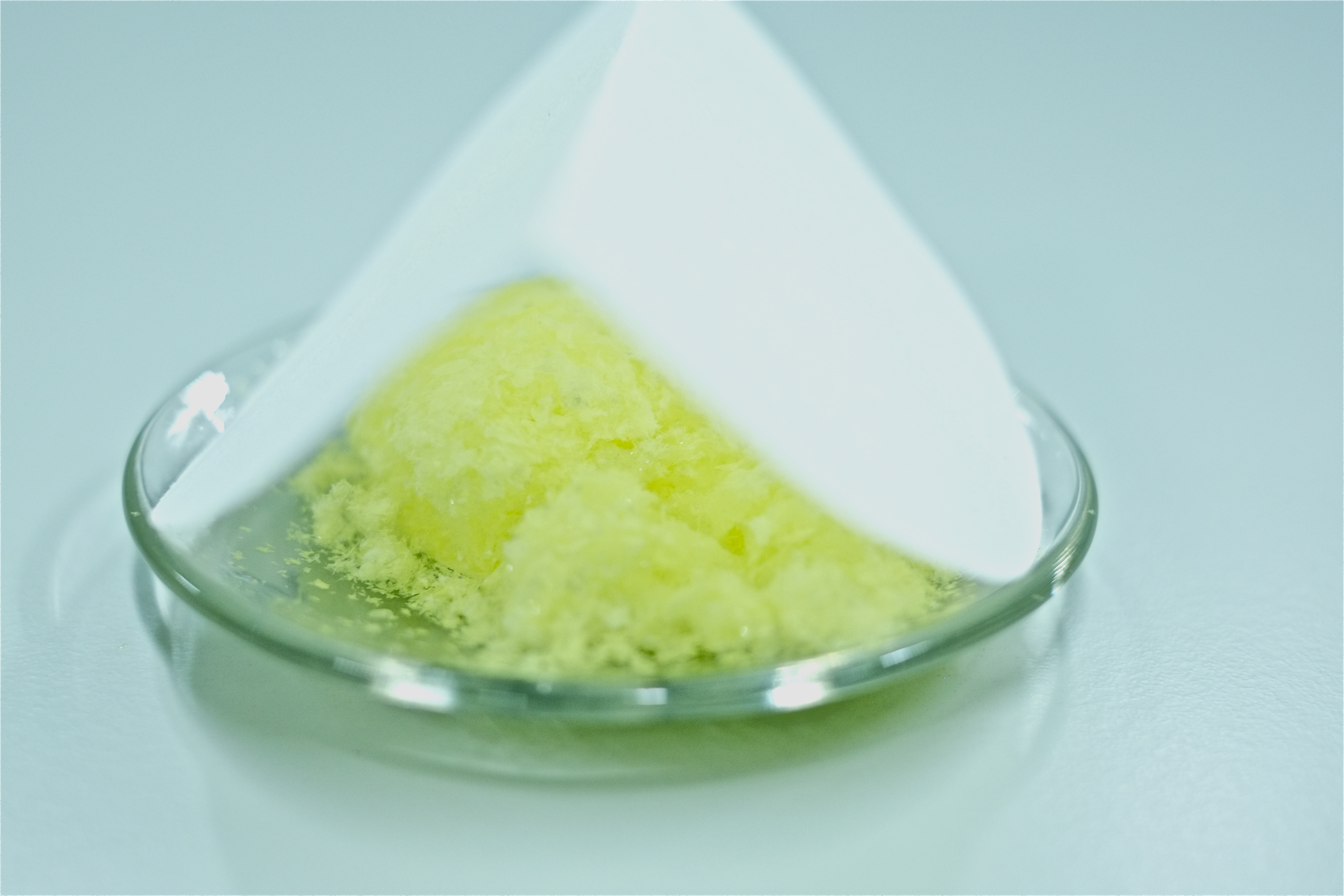
Crystal solids on a watch glass with folded paper above

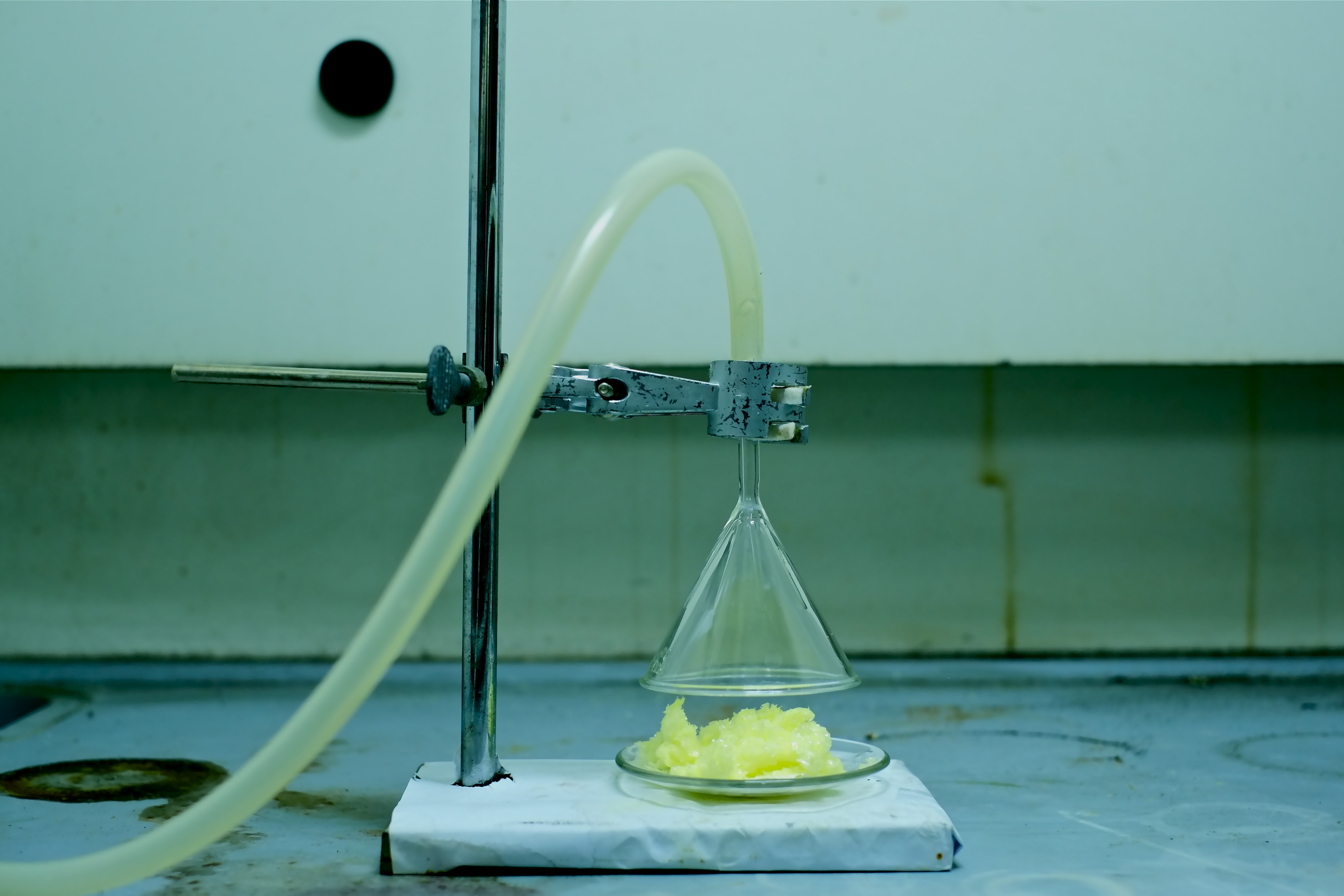
Drying crystal solids using a watch glass and passing a stream of dry air from an inverted funnel

One of the generic uses of a watch glass is as a lid for beakers. In this case, a watch glass is placed above the container, which makes it easier to control and alter vapor saturation conditions. Moreover, a watch glass is often used to house solids being weighed on the scale. Before weighing desired amount of solid, a watch glass is placed on the scale, followed by taring or zeroing the scale so that only the weight of the sample substance is obtained. A watch glass can also be used for observing precipitation and crystallization patterns. When further drying of a substance is required, a watch glass is often used in cases where a particular type of solid needs to be separated from its comparatively volatile solvent. The solid is spread on a watch glass and, often, a folded piece of filter paper is placed above to keep airborne particles from contaminating the product. To maximize the drying rate, a watch glass can be placed inside a fume hood to provide good air circulation for an adequate amount of time. Another technique used in chemistry laboratories to increase the drying rate is passing a gentle stream of dry air or nitrogen gas over the watch glass from an inverted funnel clamped above it.

== Types ==
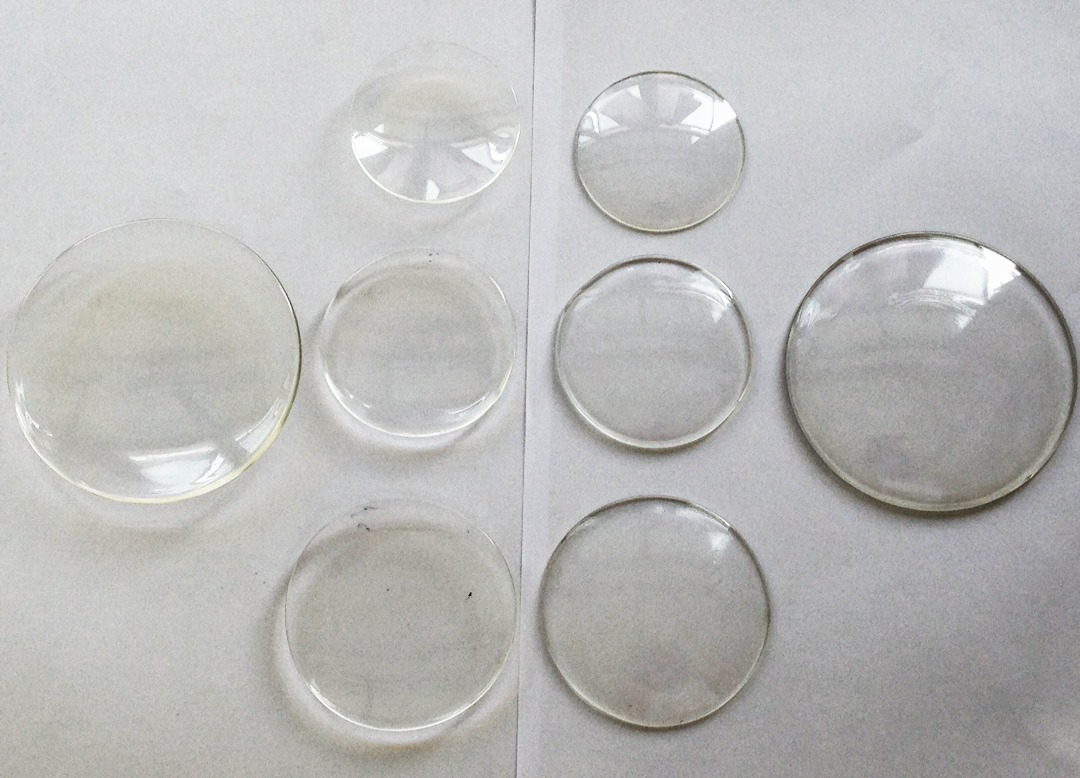
Front and back image of different sizes for watch glasses used in laboratory.

There are two types of the watch glass, glass and plastic, used in the laboratory. Watch glasses are available in various sizes and widths, and are usually thicker than any other glass or plastic labware.

- Glass watch glasses – These can be reused after they are sterilized in an autoclave or a laboratory oven. The glasses provide high resistance to thermal shock, chemical resistance, and mechanical durability.
- Plastic watch glasses – These are disposable watch-glass used in laboratory work to avoid cross-contamination while preparing the samples. They are very good at implementing in low temperatures and have an operating span of −57 to 135 °C (−71 to 275 °F); they can also resist UV light degradation. These plastic watch glasses are less expensive and light in weight.

== See also ==
- Laboratory glassware
